This is a partial list of unnumbered minor planets for principal provisional designations assigned during 16–31 August 2002. Since this period yielded a high number of provisional discoveries, it is further split into several standalone pages. , a total of 470 bodies remain unnumbered for this period. Objects for this year are listed on the following pages: A–B · C · D–F · G–K · L–O · P · Qi · Qii · Ri · Rii · S · Ti · Tii · U–V and W–Y. Also see previous and next year.

Q 

|- id="2002 QC" bgcolor=#FA8072
| 0 || 2002 QC || MCA || 18.1 || data-sort-value="0.71" | 710 m || multiple || 2002–2021 || 10 Jan 2021 || 143 || align=left | Disc.: AMOSAlt.: 2006 XX48 || 
|- id="2002 QD" bgcolor=#d6d6d6
| 0 || 2002 QD || MBA-O || 16.7 || 2.5 km || multiple || 2002–2020 || 26 Jan 2020 || 99 || align=left | Disc.: NEATAlt.: 2013 WE52 || 
|- id="2002 QC1" bgcolor=#E9E9E9
| 3 ||  || MBA-M || 18.7 || data-sort-value="0.54" | 540 m || multiple || 2002–2018 || 10 Jul 2018 || 31 || align=left | Disc.: NEAT || 
|- id="2002 QY1" bgcolor=#E9E9E9
| 0 ||  || MBA-M || 17.56 || data-sort-value="0.91" | 910 m || multiple || 1998–2021 || 15 Apr 2021 || 83 || align=left | Disc.: NEAT || 
|- id="2002 QJ2" bgcolor=#E9E9E9
| 0 ||  || MBA-M || 16.9 || 1.8 km || multiple || 2002–2021 || 17 Jan 2021 || 174 || align=left | Disc.: AMOS || 
|- id="2002 QX3" bgcolor=#fefefe
| 0 ||  || MBA-I || 17.9 || data-sort-value="0.78" | 780 m || multiple || 2002–2020 || 20 Oct 2020 || 120 || align=left | Disc.: NEAT || 
|- id="2002 QE4" bgcolor=#E9E9E9
| 0 ||  || MBA-M || 16.7 || 1.9 km || multiple || 2002–2019 || 25 Oct 2019 || 221 || align=left | Disc.: AMOS || 
|- id="2002 QB6" bgcolor=#E9E9E9
| 0 ||  || MBA-M || 17.43 || data-sort-value="0.97" | 970 m || multiple || 2002–2021 || 06 Apr 2021 || 79 || align=left | Disc.: LINEARAlt.: 2012 BO7 || 
|- id="2002 QU6" bgcolor=#FA8072
| 0 ||  || MCA || 19.3 || data-sort-value="0.41" | 410 m || multiple || 2002–2021 || 08 Jun 2021 || 163 || align=left | Disc.: LINEAR || 
|- id="2002 QW6" bgcolor=#FA8072
| 2 ||  || MCA || 19.4 || data-sort-value="0.39" | 390 m || multiple || 2002–2021 || 10 Aug 2021 || 66 || align=left | Disc.: AMOSAlt.: 2021 HV22 || 
|- id="2002 QX6" bgcolor=#FA8072
| 1 ||  || MCA || 19.0 || data-sort-value="0.88" | 880 m || multiple || 2002–2019 || 01 Oct 2019 || 84 || align=left | Disc.: NEAT || 
|- id="2002 QZ6" bgcolor=#FFC2E0
| 1 ||  || AMO || 19.7 || data-sort-value="0.41" | 410 m || multiple || 2002–2013 || 08 Oct 2013 || 413 || align=left | Disc.: AMOS || 
|- id="2002 QB9" bgcolor=#E9E9E9
| 0 ||  || MBA-M || 16.6 || 2.0 km || multiple || 2002–2019 || 17 Oct 2019 || 195 || align=left | Disc.: NEAT || 
|- id="2002 QH10" bgcolor=#FFC2E0
| 4 ||  || AMO || 20.3 || data-sort-value="0.31" | 310 m || single || 114 days || 12 Dec 2002 || 179 || align=left | Disc.: NEATPotentially hazardous object || 
|- id="2002 QJ10" bgcolor=#FA8072
| 1 ||  || HUN || 18.0 || data-sort-value="0.75" | 750 m || multiple || 2002–2020 || 12 Oct 2020 || 97 || align=left | Disc.: NEAT || 
|- id="2002 QL10" bgcolor=#FA8072
| 0 ||  || MCA || 19.85 || data-sort-value="0.32" | 320 m || multiple || 2002–2021 || 08 Nov 2021 || 63 || align=left | Disc.: NEAT || 
|- id="2002 QM10" bgcolor=#d6d6d6
| 2 ||  || MBA-O || 17.1 || 2.1 km || multiple || 2002–2018 || 18 Aug 2018 || 30 || align=left | Disc.: NEATAlt.: 2013 VF1 || 
|- id="2002 QP10" bgcolor=#E9E9E9
| 0 ||  || MBA-M || 17.76 || data-sort-value="0.83" | 830 m || multiple || 2002–2021 || 09 Apr 2021 || 55 || align=left | Disc.: NEAT || 
|- id="2002 QR10" bgcolor=#E9E9E9
| 0 ||  || MBA-M || 17.75 || data-sort-value="0.84" | 840 m || multiple || 2002–2021 || 03 Apr 2021 || 55 || align=left | Disc.: NEATAlt.: 2006 PD21, 2014 OQ176 || 
|- id="2002 QS10" bgcolor=#fefefe
| 0 ||  || MBA-I || 17.5 || data-sort-value="0.94" | 940 m || multiple || 2002–2021 || 12 Jan 2021 || 87 || align=left | Disc.: NEATAlt.: 2010 AR83 || 
|- id="2002 QT10" bgcolor=#E9E9E9
| 0 ||  || MBA-M || 17.4 || 1.4 km || multiple || 2002–2020 || 09 Dec 2020 || 100 || align=left | Disc.: NEAT || 
|- id="2002 QU10" bgcolor=#d6d6d6
| 1 ||  || MBA-O || 18.3 || 1.2 km || multiple || 2002–2017 || 10 Oct 2017 || 61 || align=left | Disc.: NEAT || 
|- id="2002 QZ10" bgcolor=#d6d6d6
| 0 ||  || MBA-O || 16.3 || 3.1 km || multiple || 2002–2019 || 25 Oct 2019 || 75 || align=left | Disc.: NEATAlt.: 2002 QA11 || 
|- id="2002 QO11" bgcolor=#fefefe
| 0 ||  || MBA-I || 18.4 || data-sort-value="0.62" | 620 m || multiple || 2002–2019 || 28 Oct 2019 || 125 || align=left | Disc.: NEATAlt.: 2009 SW35 || 
|- id="2002 QU11" bgcolor=#E9E9E9
| 0 ||  || MBA-M || 17.4 || 1.4 km || multiple || 2002–2020 || 19 Jan 2020 || 241 || align=left | Disc.: NEAT || 
|- id="2002 QC12" bgcolor=#fefefe
| 0 ||  || MBA-I || 17.8 || data-sort-value="0.82" | 820 m || multiple || 2002–2019 || 04 Oct 2019 || 152 || align=left | Disc.: NEAT || 
|- id="2002 QD12" bgcolor=#E9E9E9
| 2 ||  || MBA-M || 18.3 || data-sort-value="0.65" | 650 m || multiple || 2002–2020 || 22 Jan 2020 || 70 || align=left | Disc.: NEAT || 
|- id="2002 QR12" bgcolor=#FA8072
| 0 ||  || MCA || 19.22 || data-sort-value="0.43" | 430 m || multiple || 2002–2021 || 25 Nov 2021 || 81 || align=left | Disc.: NEAT || 
|- id="2002 QZ12" bgcolor=#E9E9E9
| 0 ||  || MBA-M || 17.61 || data-sort-value="0.89" | 890 m || multiple || 2002–2021 || 14 Apr 2021 || 99 || align=left | Disc.: NEAT || 
|- id="2002 QK13" bgcolor=#d6d6d6
| 0 ||  || MBA-O || 16.5 || 2.8 km || multiple || 2002–2018 || 03 Nov 2018 || 97 || align=left | Disc.: NEAT || 
|- id="2002 QU13" bgcolor=#d6d6d6
| 0 ||  || MBA-O || 16.8 || 2.4 km || multiple || 2002–2019 || 04 Oct 2019 || 63 || align=left | Disc.: NEATAlt.: 2008 TH179 || 
|- id="2002 QB15" bgcolor=#d6d6d6
| 0 ||  || MBA-O || 16.3 || 3.1 km || multiple || 2002–2021 || 06 Jan 2021 || 121 || align=left | Disc.: NEAT || 
|- id="2002 QK15" bgcolor=#E9E9E9
| 0 ||  || MBA-M || 17.0 || 2.2 km || multiple || 2002–2020 || 31 Jul 2020 || 80 || align=left | Disc.: NEAT || 
|- id="2002 QM15" bgcolor=#d6d6d6
| 0 ||  || MBA-O || 16.5 || 2.8 km || multiple || 2002–2019 || 27 Oct 2019 || 81 || align=left | Disc.: NEATAlt.: 2013 QE62 || 
|- id="2002 QO15" bgcolor=#d6d6d6
| 0 ||  || MBA-O || 16.1 || 3.4 km || multiple || 2002–2019 || 29 Nov 2019 || 114 || align=left | Disc.: NEATAlt.: 2015 AS246 || 
|- id="2002 QQ15" bgcolor=#fefefe
| 0 ||  || MBA-I || 17.39 || data-sort-value="0.99" | 990 m || multiple || 2002–2021 || 02 Dec 2021 || 214 || align=left | Disc.: NEATAlt.: 2017 SS31 || 
|- id="2002 QY15" bgcolor=#E9E9E9
| 1 ||  || MBA-M || 16.3 || 1.6 km || multiple || 2002–2020 || 18 Jan 2020 || 187 || align=left | Disc.: LINEAR || 
|- id="2002 QG17" bgcolor=#FA8072
| – ||  || MCA || 19.1 || data-sort-value="0.45" | 450 m || single || 18 days || 14 Sep 2002 || 29 || align=left | Disc.: NEAT || 
|- id="2002 QJ17" bgcolor=#E9E9E9
| 0 ||  || MBA-M || 16.9 || 1.2 km || multiple || 2002–2021 || 24 Jan 2021 || 104 || align=left | Disc.: NEAT || 
|- id="2002 QD18" bgcolor=#d6d6d6
| 0 ||  || MBA-O || 16.5 || 2.8 km || multiple || 1992–2020 || 25 Feb 2020 || 203 || align=left | Disc.: NEATAlt.: 2013 SH85 || 
|- id="2002 QA20" bgcolor=#fefefe
| 0 ||  || MBA-I || 18.7 || data-sort-value="0.54" | 540 m || multiple || 1999–2018 || 10 Oct 2018 || 91 || align=left | Disc.: NEATAlt.: 2011 FY85 || 
|- id="2002 QO21" bgcolor=#fefefe
| 0 ||  || MBA-I || 17.6 || data-sort-value="0.90" | 900 m || multiple || 2002–2021 || 17 Jan 2021 || 122 || align=left | Disc.: NEAT || 
|- id="2002 QR21" bgcolor=#d6d6d6
| 0 ||  || MBA-O || 16.14 || 3.3 km || multiple || 2002–2022 || 27 Jan 2022 || 152 || align=left | Disc.: NEATAlt.: 2013 KK2 || 
|- id="2002 QA22" bgcolor=#d6d6d6
| 1 ||  || MBA-O || 17.3 || 1.9 km || multiple || 2002–2014 || 24 Dec 2014 || 78 || align=left | Disc.: NEATAlt.: 2008 SG226 || 
|- id="2002 QC22" bgcolor=#d6d6d6
| 0 ||  || MBA-O || 16.3 || 3.1 km || multiple || 2002–2019 || 01 Nov 2019 || 127 || align=left | Disc.: NEAT || 
|- id="2002 QZ22" bgcolor=#fefefe
| 0 ||  || MBA-I || 17.9 || data-sort-value="0.78" | 780 m || multiple || 2002–2020 || 12 Dec 2020 || 163 || align=left | Disc.: NEAT || 
|- id="2002 QL23" bgcolor=#E9E9E9
| 0 ||  || MBA-M || 17.7 || data-sort-value="0.86" | 860 m || multiple || 2002–2020 || 22 Jan 2020 || 82 || align=left | Disc.: NEAT || 
|- id="2002 QH24" bgcolor=#E9E9E9
| 2 ||  || MBA-M || 18.3 || data-sort-value="0.92" | 920 m || multiple || 2002–2019 || 28 May 2019 || 26 || align=left | Disc.: NEATAlt.: 2015 MQ14 || 
|- id="2002 QN24" bgcolor=#fefefe
| 0 ||  || MBA-I || 18.48 || data-sort-value="0.60" | 600 m || multiple || 2002–2021 || 06 Nov 2021 || 96 || align=left | Disc.: NEAT || 
|- id="2002 QO24" bgcolor=#FA8072
| 0 ||  || MCA || 18.23 || data-sort-value="0.67" | 670 m || multiple || 2002–2021 || 28 Oct 2021 || 185 || align=left | Disc.: NEAT || 
|- id="2002 QP24" bgcolor=#E9E9E9
| 0 ||  || MBA-M || 17.70 || 1.2 km || multiple || 2002–2021 || 16 Jan 2021 || 116 || align=left | Disc.: NEATAlt.: 2015 TK228 || 
|- id="2002 QQ24" bgcolor=#fefefe
| 2 ||  || MBA-I || 18.7 || data-sort-value="0.54" | 540 m || multiple || 2002–2020 || 03 Nov 2020 || 74 || align=left | Disc.: NEAT || 
|- id="2002 QK25" bgcolor=#fefefe
| 0 ||  || MBA-I || 19.36 || data-sort-value="0.40" | 400 m || multiple || 2002–2021 || 27 Nov 2021 || 68 || align=left | Disc.: LPL/Spacewatch II || 
|- id="2002 QO25" bgcolor=#d6d6d6
| 0 ||  || MBA-O || 16.7 || 2.5 km || multiple || 2002–2021 || 17 Jan 2021 || 105 || align=left | Disc.: LPL/Spacewatch II || 
|- id="2002 QT25" bgcolor=#fefefe
| 0 ||  || MBA-I || 17.70 || data-sort-value="0.86" | 860 m || multiple || 2001–2021 || 08 Sep 2021 || 138 || align=left | Disc.: LPL/Spacewatch IIAlt.: 2014 WR214 || 
|- id="2002 QU25" bgcolor=#fefefe
| 0 ||  || MBA-I || 19.27 || data-sort-value="0.42" | 420 m || multiple || 2002–2021 || 31 Oct 2021 || 72 || align=left | Disc.: LPL/Spacewatch II || 
|- id="2002 QC26" bgcolor=#d6d6d6
| 0 ||  || MBA-O || 16.1 || 3.4 km || multiple || 2002–2019 || 29 Nov 2019 || 97 || align=left | Disc.: LPL/Spacewatch IIAlt.: 2005 EQ231, 2010 GZ72 || 
|- id="2002 QO26" bgcolor=#E9E9E9
| 2 ||  || MBA-M || 18.1 || 1.3 km || multiple || 2002–2020 || 08 Nov 2020 || 108 || align=left | Disc.: LPL/Spacewatch IIAlt.: 2011 QZ35 || 
|- id="2002 QN27" bgcolor=#E9E9E9
| 0 ||  || MBA-M || 17.1 || 1.6 km || multiple || 1998–2021 || 15 Jan 2021 || 222 || align=left | Disc.: NEATAlt.: 2011 UK38 || 
|- id="2002 QT28" bgcolor=#E9E9E9
| 0 ||  || MBA-M || 17.8 || 1.2 km || multiple || 1998–2019 || 27 Oct 2019 || 128 || align=left | Disc.: NEAT || 
|- id="2002 QK29" bgcolor=#E9E9E9
| 0 ||  || MBA-M || 16.7 || 2.5 km || multiple || 2002–2020 || 26 Dec 2020 || 316 || align=left | Disc.: NEAT || 
|- id="2002 QT29" bgcolor=#FA8072
| 1 ||  || MCA || 18.5 || data-sort-value="0.59" | 590 m || multiple || 2002–2020 || 24 Dec 2020 || 53 || align=left | Disc.: NEAT || 
|- id="2002 QN32" bgcolor=#fefefe
| 0 ||  || MBA-I || 18.00 || data-sort-value="0.75" | 750 m || multiple || 2002–2022 || 26 Jan 2022 || 164 || align=left | Disc.: NEATAlt.: 2013 SY18 || 
|- id="2002 QT32" bgcolor=#fefefe
| 0 ||  || MBA-I || 17.7 || data-sort-value="0.86" | 860 m || multiple || 2002–2021 || 18 Jan 2021 || 209 || align=left | Disc.: NEAT || 
|- id="2002 QQ33" bgcolor=#fefefe
| 0 ||  || MBA-I || 18.01 || data-sort-value="0.74" | 740 m || multiple || 2002–2021 || 24 Nov 2021 || 143 || align=left | Disc.: NEATAlt.: 2002 SP62 || 
|- id="2002 QF34" bgcolor=#d6d6d6
| 0 ||  || MBA-O || 16.37 || 3.0 km || multiple || 1999–2021 || 03 May 2021 || 184 || align=left | Disc.: NEATAlt.: 2013 WJ103 || 
|- id="2002 QJ34" bgcolor=#fefefe
| 0 ||  || MBA-I || 18.45 || data-sort-value="0.61" | 610 m || multiple || 2002–2021 || 30 Nov 2021 || 108 || align=left | Disc.: NEAT || 
|- id="2002 QQ35" bgcolor=#fefefe
| 0 ||  || MBA-I || 17.8 || data-sort-value="0.82" | 820 m || multiple || 1995–2020 || 08 Oct 2020 || 158 || align=left | Disc.: NEAT || 
|- id="2002 QY36" bgcolor=#fefefe
| 0 ||  || MBA-I || 18.1 || data-sort-value="0.71" | 710 m || multiple || 1992–2021 || 18 Jan 2021 || 117 || align=left | Disc.: LPL/Spacewatch IIAlt.: 2016 SR15 || 
|- id="2002 QN38" bgcolor=#fefefe
| 0 ||  || MBA-I || 19.10 || data-sort-value="0.45" | 450 m || multiple || 2002–2021 || 08 Dec 2021 || 71 || align=left | Disc.: LPL/Spacewatch II || 
|- id="2002 QT38" bgcolor=#E9E9E9
| 0 ||  || MBA-M || 18.3 || data-sort-value="0.92" | 920 m || multiple || 2002–2020 || 17 Dec 2020 || 48 || align=left | Disc.: LPL/Spacewatch IIAdded on 9 March 2021Alt.: 2015 PL148 || 
|- id="2002 QV38" bgcolor=#d6d6d6
| – ||  || MBA-O || 18.3 || 1.2 km || single || 41 days || 10 Oct 2002 || 10 || align=left | Disc.: LPL/Spacewatch II || 
|- id="2002 QU39" bgcolor=#E9E9E9
| 0 ||  || MBA-M || 17.0 || 1.2 km || multiple || 1998–2019 || 26 Oct 2019 || 170 || align=left | Disc.: NEATAlt.: 2014 JJ30 || 
|- id="2002 QB40" bgcolor=#d6d6d6
| 1 ||  || MBA-O || 16.7 || 2.5 km || multiple || 2002–2019 || 29 Nov 2019 || 70 || align=left | Disc.: NEATAlt.: 2019 OW15 || 
|- id="2002 QQ40" bgcolor=#FFC2E0
| 5 ||  || APO || 21.5 || data-sort-value="0.18" | 180 m || multiple || 2002–2018 || 07 Aug 2018 || 66 || align=left | Disc.: NEATPotentially hazardous object || 
|- id="2002 QO43" bgcolor=#E9E9E9
| 0 ||  || MBA-M || 16.7 || 1.4 km || multiple || 2002–2021 || 12 Jun 2021 || 122 || align=left | Disc.: NEAT || 
|- id="2002 QO44" bgcolor=#d6d6d6
| 0 ||  || MBA-O || 15.92 || 3.6 km || multiple || 2002–2021 || 17 Apr 2021 || 245 || align=left | Disc.: NEAT || 
|- id="2002 QF45" bgcolor=#E9E9E9
| 0 ||  || MBA-M || 16.9 || 2.3 km || multiple || 2002–2020 || 17 Nov 2020 || 219 || align=left | Disc.: NEAT || 
|- id="2002 QE46" bgcolor=#d6d6d6
| 1 ||  || MBA-O || 16.2 || 3.2 km || multiple || 2002–2019 || 21 Jan 2019 || 121 || align=left | Disc.: NEATAlt.: 2010 LL10 || 
|- id="2002 QG46" bgcolor=#FFC2E0
| 0 ||  || APO || 19.75 || data-sort-value="0.40" | 400 m || multiple || 2002–2021 || 30 Sep 2021 || 280 || align=left | Disc.: NEAT || 
|- id="2002 QM46" bgcolor=#E9E9E9
| 0 ||  || MBA-M || 17.4 || 1.4 km || multiple || 2002–2021 || 18 Jan 2021 || 132 || align=left | Disc.: NEATAlt.: 2011 WY40 || 
|- id="2002 QC47" bgcolor=#E9E9E9
| 0 ||  || MBA-M || 17.2 || 1.5 km || multiple || 2002–2021 || 17 Jan 2021 || 215 || align=left | Disc.: NEAT || 
|- id="2002 QD47" bgcolor=#FA8072
| 2 ||  || MCA || 18.5 || data-sort-value="0.59" | 590 m || multiple || 2002–2019 || 26 May 2019 || 99 || align=left | Disc.: NEAT || 
|- id="2002 QE47" bgcolor=#FFC2E0
| 2 ||  || AMO || 22.2 || data-sort-value="0.13" | 130 m || multiple || 2002–2007 || 30 Dec 2007 || 43 || align=left | Disc.: LPL/Spacewatch II || 
|- id="2002 QN47" bgcolor=#E9E9E9
| 0 ||  || MBA-M || 17.2 || 1.5 km || multiple || 2002–2020 || 15 Feb 2020 || 178 || align=left | Disc.: LONEOS || 
|- id="2002 QV47" bgcolor=#d6d6d6
| – ||  || MBA-O || 16.2 || 3.2 km || single || 39 days || 25 Sep 2002 || 27 || align=left | Disc.: Table Mountain Obs. || 
|- id="2002 QW47" bgcolor=#FFC2E0
| 1 ||  || APO || 20.5 || data-sort-value="0.28" | 280 m || multiple || 2002–2016 || 09 Oct 2016 || 51 || align=left | Disc.: NEATPotentially hazardous object || 
|- id="2002 QY48" bgcolor=#E9E9E9
| 0 ||  || MBA-M || 17.65 || data-sort-value="0.88" | 880 m || multiple || 2002–2021 || 15 Apr 2021 || 62 || align=left | Disc.: NEATAlt.: 2010 GA198 || 
|- id="2002 QB49" bgcolor=#E9E9E9
| 1 ||  || MBA-M || 17.7 || 1.2 km || multiple || 2002–2020 || 07 Dec 2020 || 137 || align=left | Disc.: NEAT || 
|- id="2002 QE49" bgcolor=#E9E9E9
| 1 ||  || MBA-M || 17.4 || data-sort-value="0.98" | 980 m || multiple || 2002–2019 || 17 Dec 2019 || 105 || align=left | Disc.: NEAT || 
|- id="2002 QM49" bgcolor=#E9E9E9
| 1 ||  || MBA-M || 18.2 || 1.3 km || multiple || 2002–2020 || 17 Oct 2020 || 85 || align=left | Disc.: NEATAlt.: 2011 QY13 || 
|- id="2002 QP49" bgcolor=#fefefe
| 2 ||  || MBA-I || 18.8 || data-sort-value="0.52" | 520 m || multiple || 2002–2016 || 04 Oct 2016 || 35 || align=left | Disc.: NEAT || 
|- id="2002 QZ49" bgcolor=#E9E9E9
| 2 ||  || MBA-M || 18.2 || data-sort-value="0.96" | 960 m || multiple || 2002–2020 || 17 Dec 2020 || 39 || align=left | Disc.: NEATAlt.: 2011 SV245 || 
|- id="2002 QE50" bgcolor=#d6d6d6
| 1 ||  || MBA-O || 15.8 || 3.9 km || multiple || 2002–2020 || 21 May 2020 || 180 || align=left | Disc.: NEAT || 
|- id="2002 QG50" bgcolor=#E9E9E9
| 1 ||  || MBA-M || 17.8 || data-sort-value="0.82" | 820 m || multiple || 2001–2019 || 28 Nov 2019 || 132 || align=left | Disc.: NEAT || 
|- id="2002 QZ50" bgcolor=#E9E9E9
| 0 ||  || MBA-M || 17.4 || 1.4 km || multiple || 1998–2020 || 14 Dec 2020 || 147 || align=left | Disc.: NEATAlt.: 2011 UQ29 || 
|- id="2002 QC51" bgcolor=#E9E9E9
| 1 ||  || MBA-M || 18.1 || data-sort-value="0.71" | 710 m || multiple || 2002–2020 || 23 Jan 2020 || 53 || align=left | Disc.: NEATAlt.: 2006 SC187 || 
|- id="2002 QL51" bgcolor=#FA8072
| 3 ||  || MCA || 18.6 || data-sort-value="0.57" | 570 m || multiple || 2002–2012 || 21 Oct 2012 || 26 || align=left | Disc.: NEAT || 
|- id="2002 QO51" bgcolor=#fefefe
| 0 ||  || MBA-I || 18.2 || data-sort-value="0.68" | 680 m || multiple || 2002–2021 || 18 Jan 2021 || 87 || align=left | Disc.: NEATAlt.: 2011 FT71 || 
|- id="2002 QP51" bgcolor=#fefefe
| 1 ||  || MBA-I || 18.4 || data-sort-value="0.62" | 620 m || multiple || 1995–2020 || 14 Dec 2020 || 117 || align=left | Disc.: NEATAlt.: 2013 WH82 || 
|- id="2002 QQ51" bgcolor=#fefefe
| 0 ||  || MBA-I || 18.68 || data-sort-value="0.55" | 550 m || multiple || 2002–2021 || 05 Oct 2021 || 75 || align=left | Disc.: NEATAlt.: 2006 RO49 || 
|- id="2002 QR51" bgcolor=#d6d6d6
| 0 ||  || MBA-O || 16.8 || 2.4 km || multiple || 2002–2021 || 09 Jan 2021 || 71 || align=left | Disc.: NEAT || 
|- id="2002 QU51" bgcolor=#E9E9E9
| 0 ||  || MBA-M || 17.5 || 1.3 km || multiple || 2002–2020 || 07 Dec 2020 || 72 || align=left | Disc.: NEATAlt.: 2011 UR403 || 
|- id="2002 QB52" bgcolor=#d6d6d6
| 0 ||  || MBA-O || 15.6 || 4.2 km || multiple || 2002–2019 || 28 Nov 2019 || 176 || align=left | Disc.: NEATAlt.: 2012 JK16 || 
|- id="2002 QG52" bgcolor=#fefefe
| 0 ||  || MBA-I || 18.02 || data-sort-value="0.74" | 740 m || multiple || 2002–2021 || 01 Jul 2021 || 170 || align=left | Disc.: NEAT || 
|- id="2002 QQ52" bgcolor=#E9E9E9
| – ||  || MBA-M || 18.4 || data-sort-value="0.62" | 620 m || single || 35 days || 16 Sep 2002 || 24 || align=left | Disc.: NEAT || 
|- id="2002 QU52" bgcolor=#E9E9E9
| 0 ||  || MBA-M || 17.3 || 1.5 km || multiple || 2002–2021 || 06 Jan 2021 || 148 || align=left | Disc.: NEAT || 
|- id="2002 QY52" bgcolor=#E9E9E9
| 2 ||  || MBA-M || 18.3 || data-sort-value="0.92" | 920 m || multiple || 2002–2019 || 15 Nov 2019 || 97 || align=left | Disc.: NEATAlt.: 2015 XV98 || 
|- id="2002 QF53" bgcolor=#fefefe
| 0 ||  || MBA-I || 18.5 || data-sort-value="0.59" | 590 m || multiple || 2002–2020 || 10 Dec 2020 || 58 || align=left | Disc.: NEAT || 
|- id="2002 QG53" bgcolor=#E9E9E9
| 0 ||  || MBA-M || 17.6 || data-sort-value="0.90" | 900 m || multiple || 2001–2018 || 09 Jul 2018 || 56 || align=left | Disc.: NEATAlt.: 2014 QF280 || 
|- id="2002 QL53" bgcolor=#E9E9E9
| 0 ||  || MBA-M || 17.15 || 2.1 km || multiple || 2001–2021 || 26 Nov 2021 || 143 || align=left | Disc.: NEATAlt.: 2015 FH239 || 
|- id="2002 QG54" bgcolor=#fefefe
| 0 ||  || MBA-I || 18.5 || data-sort-value="0.59" | 590 m || multiple || 2002–2019 || 26 Jul 2019 || 109 || align=left | Disc.: NEATAlt.: 2005 GB75, 2009 SF55, 2016 UN19 || 
|- id="2002 QB55" bgcolor=#fefefe
| 0 ||  || MBA-I || 18.46 || data-sort-value="0.60" | 600 m || multiple || 2002–2021 || 03 Aug 2021 || 66 || align=left | Disc.: NEATAlt.: 2006 SU303 || 
|- id="2002 QC55" bgcolor=#E9E9E9
| 0 ||  || MBA-M || 17.8 || data-sort-value="0.82" | 820 m || multiple || 2002–2019 || 08 Nov 2019 || 86 || align=left | Disc.: NEAT || 
|- id="2002 QZ55" bgcolor=#fefefe
| 0 ||  || MBA-I || 18.46 || data-sort-value="0.60" | 600 m || multiple || 2002–2021 || 08 Aug 2021 || 91 || align=left | Disc.: NEAT || 
|- id="2002 QA56" bgcolor=#d6d6d6
| 1 ||  || MBA-O || 17.5 || 1.8 km || multiple || 2002–2020 || 19 Jan 2020 || 89 || align=left | Disc.: NEATAlt.: 2018 SC7 || 
|- id="2002 QO56" bgcolor=#fefefe
| 0 ||  || MBA-I || 17.5 || data-sort-value="0.94" | 940 m || multiple || 2002–2021 || 17 Jan 2021 || 93 || align=left | Disc.: NEATAlt.: 2011 DO47 || 
|- id="2002 QU56" bgcolor=#fefefe
| 0 ||  || MBA-I || 17.4 || data-sort-value="0.98" | 980 m || multiple || 1995–2021 || 18 Jan 2021 || 144 || align=left | Disc.: NEATAlt.: 2014 AO50 || 
|- id="2002 QP57" bgcolor=#d6d6d6
| 2 ||  || MBA-O || 16.9 || 2.3 km || multiple || 2002–2019 || 09 Oct 2019 || 31 || align=left | Disc.: NEAT || 
|- id="2002 QQ57" bgcolor=#d6d6d6
| 0 ||  || MBA-O || 16.2 || 3.2 km || multiple || 2002–2021 || 12 Jan 2021 || 110 || align=left | Disc.: NEAT || 
|- id="2002 QY57" bgcolor=#E9E9E9
| 0 ||  || MBA-M || 17.4 || 1.4 km || multiple || 2002–2019 || 03 Jul 2019 || 87 || align=left | Disc.: NEAT || 
|- id="2002 QG58" bgcolor=#E9E9E9
| 0 ||  || MBA-M || 17.96 || data-sort-value="0.76" | 760 m || multiple || 2002–2021 || 15 Apr 2021 || 77 || align=left | Disc.: NEAT || 
|- id="2002 QH58" bgcolor=#d6d6d6
| 0 ||  || MBA-O || 16.81 || 2.4 km || multiple || 2002–2021 || 09 Aug 2021 || 90 || align=left | Disc.: NEATAlt.: 2012 SC45 || 
|- id="2002 QM58" bgcolor=#fefefe
| 0 ||  || MBA-I || 17.7 || data-sort-value="0.86" | 860 m || multiple || 2002–2020 || 26 Jan 2020 || 107 || align=left | Disc.: NEATAlt.: 2013 JV40 || 
|- id="2002 QN58" bgcolor=#fefefe
| 2 ||  || MBA-I || 18.9 || data-sort-value="0.49" | 490 m || multiple || 2002–2019 || 29 Nov 2019 || 54 || align=left | Disc.: NEAT || 
|- id="2002 QT58" bgcolor=#d6d6d6
| 0 ||  || MBA-O || 16.6 || 2.7 km || multiple || 2002–2020 || 24 Jan 2020 || 67 || align=left | Disc.: AMOSAlt.: 2002 QS58 || 
|- id="2002 QW58" bgcolor=#d6d6d6
| 1 ||  || MBA-O || 17.4 || 1.8 km || multiple || 2002–2019 || 04 Dec 2019 || 58 || align=left | Disc.: NEAT || 
|- id="2002 QY58" bgcolor=#d6d6d6
| 0 ||  || MBA-O || 16.5 || 2.8 km || multiple || 2002–2020 || 19 Dec 2020 || 88 || align=left | Disc.: NEAT || 
|- id="2002 QB59" bgcolor=#E9E9E9
| 0 ||  || MBA-M || 17.4 || 1.4 km || multiple || 2002–2019 || 01 Nov 2019 || 129 || align=left | Disc.: NEAT || 
|- id="2002 QD59" bgcolor=#E9E9E9
| 0 ||  || MBA-M || 17.7 || 1.2 km || multiple || 2002–2021 || 18 Jan 2021 || 152 || align=left | Disc.: NEATAlt.: 2011 WM105 || 
|- id="2002 QF59" bgcolor=#d6d6d6
| 0 ||  || MBA-O || 16.4 || 2.9 km || multiple || 2001–2021 || 18 Jan 2021 || 111 || align=left | Disc.: NEATAlt.: 2016 CR51 || 
|- id="2002 QP59" bgcolor=#d6d6d6
| 0 ||  || MBA-O || 16.9 || 2.3 km || multiple || 2002–2019 || 24 Dec 2019 || 125 || align=left | Disc.: NEATAlt.: 2012 HU46 || 
|- id="2002 QS59" bgcolor=#E9E9E9
| 0 ||  || MBA-M || 17.9 || 1.1 km || multiple || 2002–2021 || 18 Jan 2021 || 87 || align=left | Disc.: NEATAlt.: 2015 SD4 || 
|- id="2002 QV59" bgcolor=#E9E9E9
| 1 ||  || MBA-M || 17.6 || 1.3 km || multiple || 2002–2019 || 20 Oct 2019 || 53 || align=left | Disc.: NEATAlt.: 2010 CN228 || 
|- id="2002 QZ59" bgcolor=#FA8072
| 3 ||  || MCA || 19.6 || data-sort-value="0.36" | 360 m || single || 82 days || 11 Oct 2002 || 24 || align=left | Disc.: NEAT || 
|- id="2002 QA60" bgcolor=#d6d6d6
| 0 ||  || MBA-O || 17.1 || 2.1 km || multiple || 2002–2018 || 14 Aug 2018 || 39 || align=left | Disc.: NEAT || 
|- id="2002 QE60" bgcolor=#d6d6d6
| 2 ||  || MBA-O || 16.7 || 2.4 km || multiple || 2002–2018 || 04 Dec 2018 || 41 || align=left | Disc.: NEATAlt.: 2010 LV32 || 
|- id="2002 QO60" bgcolor=#E9E9E9
| 0 ||  || MBA-M || 17.0 || 1.2 km || multiple || 2002–2020 || 25 Nov 2020 || 93 || align=left | Disc.: NEAT || 
|- id="2002 QQ60" bgcolor=#d6d6d6
| 0 ||  || MBA-O || 16.9 || 2.3 km || multiple || 2002–2021 || 11 Jun 2021 || 68 || align=left | Disc.: NEAT || 
|- id="2002 QT60" bgcolor=#fefefe
| 1 ||  || MBA-I || 17.8 || data-sort-value="0.82" | 820 m || multiple || 2002–2020 || 14 Dec 2020 || 61 || align=left | Disc.: NEATAlt.: 2011 EA109 || 
|- id="2002 QV60" bgcolor=#E9E9E9
| 0 ||  || MBA-M || 17.3 || 1.5 km || multiple || 1998–2021 || 15 Jan 2021 || 172 || align=left | Disc.: NEATAlt.: 2011 YS26 || 
|- id="2002 QA61" bgcolor=#d6d6d6
| 0 ||  || MBA-O || 16.67 || 2.6 km || multiple || 2002–2021 || 14 Apr 2021 || 107 || align=left | Disc.: NEATAlt.: 2015 BE81 || 
|- id="2002 QD61" bgcolor=#fefefe
| 3 ||  || MBA-I || 18.8 || data-sort-value="0.52" | 520 m || multiple || 2002–2019 || 08 Jun 2019 || 28 || align=left | Disc.: NEATAdded on 22 July 2020 || 
|- id="2002 QW61" bgcolor=#E9E9E9
| 0 ||  || MBA-M || 17.2 || 1.5 km || multiple || 2002–2020 || 23 Dec 2020 || 89 || align=left | Disc.: NEAT || 
|- id="2002 QX61" bgcolor=#E9E9E9
| 0 ||  || MBA-M || 18.08 || data-sort-value="0.72" | 720 m || multiple || 1998–2020 || 30 Jan 2020 || 46 || align=left | Disc.: NEAT || 
|- id="2002 QH62" bgcolor=#d6d6d6
| 0 ||  || MBA-O || 16.7 || 2.5 km || multiple || 2002–2021 || 16 Jan 2021 || 77 || align=left | Disc.: NEATAlt.: 2013 RD7 || 
|- id="2002 QV62" bgcolor=#fefefe
| 0 ||  || MBA-I || 18.34 || data-sort-value="0.64" | 640 m || multiple || 2002–2021 || 14 Nov 2021 || 134 || align=left | Disc.: NEATAlt.: 2006 UU3, 2010 XH34, 2017 PG24 || 
|- id="2002 QD63" bgcolor=#fefefe
| 0 ||  || MBA-I || 18.5 || data-sort-value="0.59" | 590 m || multiple || 2002–2020 || 10 Oct 2020 || 99 || align=left | Disc.: NEATAlt.: 2013 TV138 || 
|- id="2002 QG63" bgcolor=#E9E9E9
| 0 ||  || MBA-M || 17.8 || 1.2 km || multiple || 2002–2019 || 28 Nov 2019 || 102 || align=left | Disc.: NEATAlt.: 2015 TC232 || 
|- id="2002 QJ63" bgcolor=#fefefe
| 2 ||  || MBA-I || 18.1 || data-sort-value="0.71" | 710 m || multiple || 2002–2021 || 18 Jan 2021 || 44 || align=left | Disc.: NEAT || 
|- id="2002 QO63" bgcolor=#E9E9E9
| 0 ||  || MBA-M || 17.0 || 1.7 km || multiple || 2002–2021 || 09 Jan 2021 || 117 || align=left | Disc.: NEATAlt.: 2011 UX33 || 
|- id="2002 QP63" bgcolor=#E9E9E9
| 0 ||  || MBA-M || 17.0 || 1.2 km || multiple || 2002–2021 || 16 Jan 2021 || 127 || align=left | Disc.: NEATAlt.: 2009 CF30, 2010 GU19 || 
|- id="2002 QR63" bgcolor=#fefefe
| 1 ||  || HUN || 19.0 || data-sort-value="0.47" | 470 m || multiple || 2002–2020 || 27 Aug 2020 || 53 || align=left | Disc.: NEAT || 
|- id="2002 QV63" bgcolor=#E9E9E9
| 0 ||  || MBA-M || 17.13 || 1.1 km || multiple || 2002–2021 || 20 Apr 2021 || 175 || align=left | Disc.: NEATAlt.: 2016 CT139 || 
|- id="2002 QJ64" bgcolor=#fefefe
| 0 ||  || MBA-I || 18.13 || data-sort-value="0.70" | 700 m || multiple || 2002–2021 || 25 Nov 2021 || 93 || align=left | Disc.: NEATAlt.: 2017 QC34 || 
|- id="2002 QK64" bgcolor=#E9E9E9
| 0 ||  || MBA-M || 17.52 || data-sort-value="0.93" | 930 m || multiple || 2002–2021 || 14 Apr 2021 || 77 || align=left | Disc.: NEAT || 
|- id="2002 QR64" bgcolor=#E9E9E9
| 0 ||  || MBA-M || 17.96 || 1.4 km || multiple || 2002–2022 || 25 Jan 2022 || 75 || align=left | Disc.: NEATAlt.: 2007 VQ47 || 
|- id="2002 QY64" bgcolor=#E9E9E9
| 0 ||  || MBA-M || 16.96 || 1.2 km || multiple || 1998–2021 || 09 Apr 2021 || 201 || align=left | Disc.: NEAT || 
|- id="2002 QZ64" bgcolor=#FA8072
| 2 ||  || MCA || 19.5 || data-sort-value="0.37" | 370 m || multiple || 2002–2019 || 29 Nov 2019 || 47 || align=left | Disc.: NEAT || 
|- id="2002 QN65" bgcolor=#E9E9E9
| 0 ||  || MBA-M || 17.6 || data-sort-value="0.90" | 900 m || multiple || 1998–2019 || 03 Dec 2019 || 79 || align=left | Disc.: NEAT || 
|- id="2002 QD66" bgcolor=#E9E9E9
| 0 ||  || MBA-M || 17.9 || 1.5 km || multiple || 2002–2018 || 16 Jan 2018 || 37 || align=left | Disc.: NEAT || 
|- id="2002 QL66" bgcolor=#d6d6d6
| 0 ||  || MBA-O || 16.5 || 2.8 km || multiple || 2002–2020 || 08 Dec 2020 || 88 || align=left | Disc.: NEAT || 
|- id="2002 QP66" bgcolor=#E9E9E9
| 0 ||  || MBA-M || 17.6 || 1.3 km || multiple || 2002–2021 || 18 Jan 2021 || 85 || align=left | Disc.: NEAT || 
|- id="2002 QD67" bgcolor=#E9E9E9
| 0 ||  || MBA-M || 18.4 || 1.2 km || multiple || 2002–2020 || 10 Dec 2020 || 70 || align=left | Disc.: NEAT || 
|- id="2002 QF67" bgcolor=#E9E9E9
| 1 ||  || MBA-M || 18.07 || 1.4 km || multiple || 2002–2021 || 28 Nov 2021 || 37 || align=left | Disc.: NEAT || 
|- id="2002 QL67" bgcolor=#E9E9E9
| 1 ||  || MBA-M || 17.4 || 1.4 km || multiple || 2002–2015 || 01 Dec 2015 || 58 || align=left | Disc.: NEATAlt.: 2015 MY48 || 
|- id="2002 QX67" bgcolor=#E9E9E9
| 2 ||  || MBA-M || 17.9 || 1.1 km || multiple || 2002–2020 || 20 Oct 2020 || 59 || align=left | Disc.: NEAT || 
|- id="2002 QD68" bgcolor=#fefefe
| 0 ||  || MBA-I || 17.9 || data-sort-value="0.78" | 780 m || multiple || 2002–2020 || 11 Oct 2020 || 115 || align=left | Disc.: NEATAlt.: 2016 LU36 || 
|- id="2002 QH68" bgcolor=#E9E9E9
| 0 ||  || MBA-M || 18.1 || 1.0 km || multiple || 2002–2019 || 15 Nov 2019 || 89 || align=left | Disc.: NEATAlt.: 2015 TO111 || 
|- id="2002 QS68" bgcolor=#d6d6d6
| 0 ||  || MBA-O || 16.4 || 2.9 km || multiple || 2002–2019 || 25 Oct 2019 || 35 || align=left | Disc.: NEAT || 
|- id="2002 QT68" bgcolor=#fefefe
| – ||  || MBA-I || 19.5 || data-sort-value="0.37" | 370 m || single || 17 days || 04 Sep 2002 || 13 || align=left | Disc.: NEAT || 
|- id="2002 QE69" bgcolor=#E9E9E9
| 3 ||  || MBA-M || 18.4 || data-sort-value="0.62" | 620 m || multiple || 2002–2019 || 17 Dec 2019 || 28 || align=left | Disc.: AMOS || 
|- id="2002 QT69" bgcolor=#E9E9E9
| 2 ||  || MBA-M || 18.3 || data-sort-value="0.65" | 650 m || multiple || 2002–2019 || 28 Nov 2019 || 45 || align=left | Disc.: NEAT || 
|- id="2002 QV69" bgcolor=#E9E9E9
| 0 ||  || MBA-M || 18.1 || 1.0 km || multiple || 2002–2019 || 25 Sep 2019 || 93 || align=left | Disc.: NEAT || 
|- id="2002 QY69" bgcolor=#E9E9E9
| 2 ||  || MBA-M || 18.0 || data-sort-value="0.75" | 750 m || multiple || 1994–2018 || 13 Jul 2018 || 33 || align=left | Disc.: NEAT || 
|- id="2002 QJ70" bgcolor=#fefefe
| 0 ||  || MBA-I || 18.65 || data-sort-value="0.55" | 550 m || multiple || 2002–2021 || 10 Oct 2021 || 101 || align=left | Disc.: NEATAlt.: 2006 US243, 2017 OC128 || 
|- id="2002 QQ70" bgcolor=#E9E9E9
| 0 ||  || MBA-M || 17.83 || data-sort-value="0.81" | 810 m || multiple || 2002–2021 || 17 Apr 2021 || 87 || align=left | Disc.: NEAT || 
|- id="2002 QS70" bgcolor=#E9E9E9
| 0 ||  || MBA-M || 17.2 || 2.0 km || multiple || 1993–2020 || 05 Nov 2020 || 114 || align=left | Disc.: NEATAlt.: 2014 EP7 || 
|- id="2002 QW70" bgcolor=#d6d6d6
| 0 ||  || MBA-O || 17.01 || 2.2 km || multiple || 2002–2019 || 30 Nov 2019 || 69 || align=left | Disc.: NEAT || 
|- id="2002 QB71" bgcolor=#fefefe
| – ||  || MBA-I || 18.8 || data-sort-value="0.52" | 520 m || single || 12 days || 28 Aug 2002 || 8 || align=left | Disc.: NEAT || 
|- id="2002 QH71" bgcolor=#fefefe
| 0 ||  || MBA-I || 18.2 || data-sort-value="0.68" | 680 m || multiple || 2002–2019 || 25 Oct 2019 || 62 || align=left | Disc.: NEAT || 
|- id="2002 QQ71" bgcolor=#E9E9E9
| 0 ||  || MBA-M || 17.5 || 1.3 km || multiple || 2002–2020 || 17 Dec 2020 || 97 || align=left | Disc.: NEAT || 
|- id="2002 QT71" bgcolor=#fefefe
| 1 ||  || HUN || 19.4 || data-sort-value="0.39" | 390 m || multiple || 2002–2019 || 30 Dec 2019 || 55 || align=left | Disc.: NEAT || 
|- id="2002 QW71" bgcolor=#E9E9E9
| 0 ||  || MBA-M || 17.3 || 1.9 km || multiple || 2002–2020 || 10 Oct 2020 || 104 || align=left | Disc.: NEAT || 
|- id="2002 QX71" bgcolor=#d6d6d6
| 0 ||  || MBA-O || 16.11 || 3.3 km || multiple || 2002–2022 || 26 Jan 2022 || 131 || align=left | Disc.: NEATAlt.: 2013 RT44 || 
|- id="2002 QE72" bgcolor=#d6d6d6
| 2 ||  || MBA-O || 17.0 || 2.2 km || multiple || 2002–2018 || 11 Jul 2018 || 22 || align=left | Disc.: NEAT || 
|- id="2002 QH72" bgcolor=#E9E9E9
| 1 ||  || MBA-M || 17.6 || 1.7 km || multiple || 2002–2020 || 17 Nov 2020 || 227 || align=left | Disc.: NEAT || 
|- id="2002 QQ72" bgcolor=#fefefe
| 0 ||  || MBA-I || 18.4 || data-sort-value="0.62" | 620 m || multiple || 2002–2020 || 29 Jun 2020 || 53 || align=left | Disc.: NEATAlt.: 2015 BW362 || 
|- id="2002 QS72" bgcolor=#d6d6d6
| 0 ||  || MBA-O || 17.19 || 2.0 km || multiple || 2002–2021 || 09 Apr 2021 || 44 || align=left | Disc.: NEATAlt.: 2015 AF203 || 
|- id="2002 QU72" bgcolor=#E9E9E9
| 0 ||  || MBA-M || 17.4 || 1.4 km || multiple || 2000–2021 || 18 Jan 2021 || 210 || align=left | Disc.: NEAT || 
|- id="2002 QW72" bgcolor=#fefefe
| 1 ||  || MBA-I || 18.0 || data-sort-value="0.75" | 750 m || multiple || 2002–2018 || 26 Jan 2018 || 58 || align=left | Disc.: NEAT || 
|- id="2002 QZ72" bgcolor=#E9E9E9
| 0 ||  || MBA-M || 17.1 || 1.6 km || multiple || 2002–2021 || 18 Jan 2021 || 169 || align=left | Disc.: NEATAlt.: 2011 UJ377 || 
|- id="2002 QG73" bgcolor=#E9E9E9
| 0 ||  || MBA-M || 17.5 || 1.3 km || multiple || 1998–2020 || 14 Dec 2020 || 145 || align=left | Disc.: NEATAlt.: 2011 SK123 || 
|- id="2002 QP73" bgcolor=#E9E9E9
| 0 ||  || MBA-M || 17.5 || data-sort-value="0.94" | 940 m || multiple || 2002–2020 || 26 Jan 2020 || 39 || align=left | Disc.: NEAT || 
|- id="2002 QU73" bgcolor=#E9E9E9
| 0 ||  || MBA-M || 18.0 || 1.1 km || multiple || 2002–2021 || 18 Jan 2021 || 65 || align=left | Disc.: NEAT || 
|- id="2002 QV73" bgcolor=#d6d6d6
| 0 ||  || MBA-O || 16.5 || 2.8 km || multiple || 2000–2019 || 06 Oct 2019 || 64 || align=left | Disc.: NEAT || 
|- id="2002 QX73" bgcolor=#fefefe
| – ||  || MBA-I || 19.6 || data-sort-value="0.36" | 360 m || single || 20 days || 28 Aug 2002 || 11 || align=left | Disc.: NEAT || 
|- id="2002 QC74" bgcolor=#E9E9E9
| 0 ||  || MBA-M || 17.94 || 1.4 km || multiple || 2002–2021 || 26 Nov 2021 || 52 || align=left | Disc.: NEAT || 
|- id="2002 QG74" bgcolor=#fefefe
| 1 ||  || MBA-I || 18.7 || data-sort-value="0.54" | 540 m || multiple || 2002–2020 || 22 Mar 2020 || 41 || align=left | Disc.: NEATAlt.: 2015 TB259 || 
|- id="2002 QM74" bgcolor=#fefefe
| 0 ||  || MBA-I || 18.4 || data-sort-value="0.62" | 620 m || multiple || 2002–2021 || 16 Jan 2021 || 99 || align=left | Disc.: NEAT || 
|- id="2002 QS74" bgcolor=#fefefe
| 0 ||  || MBA-I || 17.8 || data-sort-value="0.82" | 820 m || multiple || 2002–2017 || 21 Sep 2017 || 44 || align=left | Disc.: NEATAlt.: 2016 DG17 || 
|- id="2002 QU74" bgcolor=#E9E9E9
| 1 ||  || MBA-M || 18.26 || data-sort-value="0.66" | 660 m || multiple || 2002–2019 || 31 Oct 2019 || 41 || align=left | Disc.: NEAT || 
|- id="2002 QX74" bgcolor=#E9E9E9
| 0 ||  || MBA-M || 17.9 || 1.1 km || multiple || 2002–2019 || 25 Sep 2019 || 100 || align=left | Disc.: NEAT || 
|- id="2002 QZ74" bgcolor=#d6d6d6
| 0 ||  || MBA-O || 16.54 || 2.7 km || multiple || 1992–2021 || 17 Mar 2021 || 154 || align=left | Disc.: NEAT || 
|- id="2002 QB75" bgcolor=#fefefe
| 1 ||  || MBA-I || 18.5 || data-sort-value="0.59" | 590 m || multiple || 2002–2020 || 11 Dec 2020 || 46 || align=left | Disc.: NEAT || 
|- id="2002 QE75" bgcolor=#E9E9E9
| 2 ||  || MBA-M || 18.3 || 900 m || multiple || 2002-2020 || 05 Nov 2020 || 34 || align=left | Disc.: NEAT || 
|- id="2002 QF75" bgcolor=#E9E9E9
| 0 ||  || MBA-M || 17.4 || 1.4 km || multiple || 2002–2021 || 18 Jan 2021 || 194 || align=left | Disc.: NEATAlt.: 2011 WJ82 || 
|- id="2002 QH75" bgcolor=#fefefe
| 2 ||  || MBA-I || 19.1 || data-sort-value="0.45" | 450 m || multiple || 2002–2016 || 28 Aug 2016 || 21 || align=left | Disc.: NEATAdded on 21 August 2021 || 
|- id="2002 QT75" bgcolor=#fefefe
| 1 ||  || MBA-I || 18.98 || data-sort-value="0.48" | 480 m || multiple || 2002–2020 || 20 Oct 2020 || 30 || align=left | Disc.: NEAT || 
|- id="2002 QU75" bgcolor=#fefefe
| 0 ||  || MBA-I || 18.77 || data-sort-value="0.52" | 520 m || multiple || 2002–2021 || 05 Sep 2021 || 123 || align=left | Disc.: NEATAlt.: 2006 SX239 || 
|- id="2002 QX75" bgcolor=#E9E9E9
| 0 ||  || MBA-M || 17.5 || 1.3 km || multiple || 2002–2021 || 18 Jan 2021 || 140 || align=left | Disc.: NEATAlt.: 2015 TX123 || 
|- id="2002 QA76" bgcolor=#fefefe
| 0 ||  || MBA-I || 18.5 || data-sort-value="0.59" | 590 m || multiple || 2002–2019 || 11 May 2019 || 35 || align=left | Disc.: NEAT || 
|- id="2002 QD76" bgcolor=#fefefe
| 0 ||  || MBA-I || 18.25 || data-sort-value="0.67" | 670 m || multiple || 2002–2021 || 07 Nov 2021 || 95 || align=left | Disc.: NEAT || 
|- id="2002 QM76" bgcolor=#d6d6d6
| 1 ||  || MBA-O || 17.79 || 1.5 km || multiple || 2002–2021 || 04 Sep 2021 || 27 || align=left | Disc.: NEATAlt.: 2021 NK34 || 
|- id="2002 QN76" bgcolor=#d6d6d6
| 2 ||  || MBA-O || 17.0 || 2.2 km || multiple || 2002–2019 || 07 Oct 2019 || 22 || align=left | Disc.: NEAT || 
|- id="2002 QV76" bgcolor=#E9E9E9
| 0 ||  || MBA-M || 17.3 || 1.9 km || multiple || 2002–2021 || 05 Jan 2021 || 199 || align=left | Disc.: NEAT || 
|- id="2002 QX76" bgcolor=#E9E9E9
| 1 ||  || MBA-M || 17.4 || data-sort-value="0.98" | 980 m || multiple || 2002–2019 || 02 Dec 2019 || 45 || align=left | Disc.: NEAT || 
|- id="2002 QA77" bgcolor=#FA8072
| 1 ||  || MCA || 19.6 || data-sort-value="0.36" | 360 m || multiple || 2002–2018 || 12 Jul 2018 || 26 || align=left | Disc.: NEAT || 
|- id="2002 QH77" bgcolor=#d6d6d6
| 0 ||  || MBA-O || 16.9 || 2.3 km || multiple || 2002–2020 || 21 Jan 2020 || 68 || align=left | Disc.: NEAT || 
|- id="2002 QS77" bgcolor=#fefefe
| 0 ||  || MBA-I || 18.6 || data-sort-value="0.57" | 570 m || multiple || 2002–2019 || 28 Nov 2019 || 65 || align=left | Disc.: NEAT || 
|- id="2002 QT77" bgcolor=#d6d6d6
| 0 ||  || MBA-O || 16.1 || 3.4 km || multiple || 2002–2021 || 11 Jan 2021 || 122 || align=left | Disc.: NEATAlt.: 2005 EK4, 2016 CC2 || 
|- id="2002 QY77" bgcolor=#d6d6d6
| 0 ||  || MBA-O || 16.4 || 2.9 km || multiple || 2002–2021 || 06 Jan 2021 || 137 || align=left | Disc.: NEATAlt.: 2013 RY48 || 
|- id="2002 QZ77" bgcolor=#fefefe
| 0 ||  || MBA-I || 18.8 || data-sort-value="0.52" | 520 m || multiple || 2002–2020 || 22 Sep 2020 || 56 || align=left | Disc.: NEAT || 
|- id="2002 QG78" bgcolor=#d6d6d6
| 0 ||  || MBA-O || 16.69 || 2.6 km || multiple || 2002–2021 || 08 Aug 2021 || 89 || align=left | Disc.: NEAT || 
|- id="2002 QJ78" bgcolor=#fefefe
| 0 ||  || MBA-I || 18.54 || data-sort-value="0.58" | 580 m || multiple || 2002–2021 || 06 Sep 2021 || 181 || align=left | Disc.: NEATAlt.: 2014 KC30 || 
|- id="2002 QO78" bgcolor=#fefefe
| 0 ||  || MBA-I || 19.09 || data-sort-value="0.45" | 450 m || multiple || 2002–2021 || 08 May 2021 || 72 || align=left | Disc.: NEATAlt.: 2012 UN8, 2015 PA73 || 
|- id="2002 QP79" bgcolor=#E9E9E9
| 0 ||  || MBA-M || 17.4 || 1.8 km || multiple || 1998–2020 || 10 Oct 2020 || 75 || align=left | Disc.: NEAT || 
|- id="2002 QY79" bgcolor=#d6d6d6
| 0 ||  || MBA-O || 17.0 || 2.2 km || multiple || 2002–2019 || 02 Dec 2019 || 58 || align=left | Disc.: NEATAlt.: 2013 RL89 || 
|- id="2002 QD80" bgcolor=#E9E9E9
| 2 ||  || MBA-M || 18.1 || data-sort-value="0.71" | 710 m || multiple || 2002–2020 || 27 Jan 2020 || 65 || align=left | Disc.: NEAT || 
|- id="2002 QK80" bgcolor=#d6d6d6
| 2 ||  || MBA-O || 17.3 || 1.9 km || multiple || 2002–2019 || 21 Oct 2019 || 25 || align=left | Disc.: NEAT || 
|- id="2002 QR80" bgcolor=#d6d6d6
| 0 ||  || MBA-O || 16.4 || 2.9 km || multiple || 2002–2019 || 01 Nov 2019 || 69 || align=left | Disc.: NEAT || 
|- id="2002 QX80" bgcolor=#E9E9E9
| 1 ||  || MBA-M || 17.7 || data-sort-value="0.86" | 860 m || multiple || 2002–2019 || 25 Nov 2019 || 45 || align=left | Disc.: NEAT || 
|- id="2002 QA81" bgcolor=#E9E9E9
| 1 ||  || MBA-M || 17.6 || data-sort-value="0.90" | 900 m || multiple || 2002–2019 || 20 Dec 2019 || 95 || align=left | Disc.: NEATAlt.: 2014 LD15 || 
|- id="2002 QC81" bgcolor=#E9E9E9
| 0 ||  || MBA-M || 17.4 || data-sort-value="0.98" | 980 m || multiple || 2002–2021 || 11 Jun 2021 || 170 || align=left | Disc.: NEAT || 
|- id="2002 QE81" bgcolor=#d6d6d6
| 0 ||  || MBA-O || 17.2 || 2.0 km || multiple || 2002–2019 || 03 Oct 2019 || 47 || align=left | Disc.: NEAT || 
|- id="2002 QM81" bgcolor=#d6d6d6
| 2 ||  || MBA-O || 16.7 || 2.5 km || multiple || 2002–2018 || 10 Jul 2018 || 29 || align=left | Disc.: NEAT || 
|- id="2002 QO81" bgcolor=#E9E9E9
| 0 ||  || MBA-M || 17.61 || data-sort-value="0.89" | 890 m || multiple || 1994–2021 || 03 May 2021 || 92 || align=left | Disc.: NEAT || 
|- id="2002 QX81" bgcolor=#fefefe
| 0 ||  || HUN || 18.63 || data-sort-value="0.56" | 560 m || multiple || 2002–2021 || 13 Sep 2021 || 97 || align=left | Disc.: NEAT || 
|- id="2002 QA82" bgcolor=#d6d6d6
| 1 ||  || MBA-O || 17.3 || 1.9 km || multiple || 2002–2018 || 06 Oct 2018 || 39 || align=left | Disc.: NEAT || 
|- id="2002 QD82" bgcolor=#d6d6d6
| 3 ||  || MBA-O || 17.5 || 1.8 km || multiple || 2002–2018 || 11 Nov 2018 || 43 || align=left | Disc.: NEAT || 
|- id="2002 QE82" bgcolor=#E9E9E9
| 1 ||  || MBA-M || 18.2 || data-sort-value="0.96" | 960 m || multiple || 2002–2019 || 29 Jun 2019 || 57 || align=left | Disc.: NEAT || 
|- id="2002 QL82" bgcolor=#fefefe
| 0 ||  || MBA-I || 18.2 || data-sort-value="0.68" | 680 m || multiple || 2002–2020 || 08 Dec 2020 || 94 || align=left | Disc.: NEAT || 
|- id="2002 QP82" bgcolor=#E9E9E9
| 0 ||  || MBA-M || 17.1 || 2.1 km || multiple || 2002–2020 || 20 Jul 2020 || 62 || align=left | Disc.: NEAT || 
|- id="2002 QS82" bgcolor=#fefefe
| 3 ||  || MBA-I || 18.9 || data-sort-value="0.49" | 490 m || multiple || 2002–2019 || 26 Sep 2019 || 36 || align=left | Disc.: NEAT || 
|- id="2002 QT82" bgcolor=#fefefe
| 0 ||  || MBA-I || 18.9 || data-sort-value="0.49" | 490 m || multiple || 2002–2019 || 04 Nov 2019 || 64 || align=left | Disc.: NEAT || 
|- id="2002 QX82" bgcolor=#fefefe
| 1 ||  || MBA-I || 19.1 || data-sort-value="0.45" | 450 m || multiple || 2002–2017 || 27 Nov 2017 || 47 || align=left | Disc.: NEAT || 
|- id="2002 QF83" bgcolor=#d6d6d6
| 0 ||  || MBA-O || 16.37 || 3.0 km || multiple || 2002–2021 || 03 May 2021 || 205 || align=left | Disc.: NEATAlt.: 2010 CB88, 2015 BN352 || 
|- id="2002 QG83" bgcolor=#FA8072
| 0 ||  || MCA || 18.8 || data-sort-value="0.52" | 520 m || multiple || 2002–2020 || 13 May 2020 || 82 || align=left | Disc.: NEAT || 
|- id="2002 QL83" bgcolor=#d6d6d6
| 0 ||  || MBA-O || 16.91 || 2.3 km || multiple || 2002–2021 || 29 Apr 2021 || 72 || align=left | Disc.: NEAT || 
|- id="2002 QS83" bgcolor=#d6d6d6
| 0 ||  || MBA-O || 16.5 || 2.8 km || multiple || 2002–2018 || 02 Oct 2018 || 52 || align=left | Disc.: NEAT || 
|- id="2002 QA84" bgcolor=#d6d6d6
| 2 ||  || MBA-O || 17.5 || 1.8 km || multiple || 2002–2019 || 04 Feb 2019 || 36 || align=left | Disc.: NEAT || 
|- id="2002 QC84" bgcolor=#d6d6d6
| 0 ||  || MBA-O || 16.1 || 3.4 km || multiple || 2002–2021 || 18 Jan 2021 || 152 || align=left | Disc.: NEATAlt.: 2011 FF140 || 
|- id="2002 QG84" bgcolor=#E9E9E9
| 0 ||  || MBA-M || 17.74 || 1.2 km || multiple || 2002–2022 || 26 Jan 2022 || 120 || align=left | Disc.: NEAT || 
|- id="2002 QP84" bgcolor=#fefefe
| 0 ||  || MBA-I || 18.0 || data-sort-value="0.75" | 750 m || multiple || 2002–2020 || 12 Dec 2020 || 115 || align=left | Disc.: NEAT || 
|- id="2002 QS84" bgcolor=#E9E9E9
| 0 ||  || MBA-M || 17.63 || 1.7 km || multiple || 2002–2022 || 27 Jan 2022 || 78 || align=left | Disc.: NEATAlt.: 2020 RX10 || 
|- id="2002 QV84" bgcolor=#fefefe
| 0 ||  || MBA-I || 18.60 || data-sort-value="0.57" | 570 m || multiple || 2002–2021 || 06 Apr 2021 || 74 || align=left | Disc.: NEAT || 
|- id="2002 QA85" bgcolor=#FA8072
| – ||  || MCA || 18.8 || data-sort-value="0.73" | 730 m || single || 11 days || 27 Aug 2002 || 15 || align=left | Disc.: NEAT || 
|- id="2002 QB85" bgcolor=#fefefe
| 0 ||  || MBA-I || 18.5 || data-sort-value="0.59" | 590 m || multiple || 2002–2019 || 15 Nov 2019 || 55 || align=left | Disc.: NEAT || 
|- id="2002 QG85" bgcolor=#d6d6d6
| 0 ||  || MBA-O || 16.6 || 2.7 km || multiple || 2002–2020 || 27 Jan 2020 || 73 || align=left | Disc.: NEAT || 
|- id="2002 QH85" bgcolor=#fefefe
| 0 ||  || MBA-I || 18.1 || data-sort-value="0.71" | 710 m || multiple || 2002–2020 || 14 Jul 2020 || 86 || align=left | Disc.: NEATAlt.: 2013 RQ58 || 
|- id="2002 QM85" bgcolor=#FA8072
| 1 ||  || MCA || 20.1 || data-sort-value="0.28" | 280 m || multiple || 2002–2020 || 19 Nov 2020 || 110 || align=left | Disc.: NEAT || 
|- id="2002 QF86" bgcolor=#d6d6d6
| 0 ||  || MBA-O || 16.6 || 2.7 km || multiple || 2000–2020 || 12 Apr 2020 || 86 || align=left | Disc.: NEAT || 
|- id="2002 QL86" bgcolor=#E9E9E9
| 0 ||  || MBA-M || 16.87 || 2.4 km || multiple || 2002–2021 || 08 Dec 2021 || 130 || align=left | Disc.: NEATAlt.: 2016 QV23 || 
|- id="2002 QM86" bgcolor=#E9E9E9
| 1 ||  || MBA-M || 17.9 || data-sort-value="0.78" | 780 m || multiple || 2002–2020 || 22 Jan 2020 || 84 || align=left | Disc.: NEATAlt.: 2015 XP197 || 
|- id="2002 QV86" bgcolor=#E9E9E9
| 1 ||  || MBA-M || 18.3 || data-sort-value="0.65" | 650 m || multiple || 2002–2019 || 01 Nov 2019 || 34 || align=left | Disc.: NEAT || 
|- id="2002 QX86" bgcolor=#d6d6d6
| 3 ||  || MBA-O || 17.3 || 1.9 km || multiple || 2002–2019 || 24 Oct 2019 || 36 || align=left | Disc.: NEAT || 
|- id="2002 QY86" bgcolor=#fefefe
| 0 ||  || MBA-I || 17.9 || data-sort-value="0.78" | 780 m || multiple || 2002–2021 || 15 Jan 2021 || 138 || align=left | Disc.: NEATAlt.: 2009 SE169 || 
|- id="2002 QJ87" bgcolor=#fefefe
| 3 ||  || MBA-I || 18.7 || data-sort-value="0.54" | 540 m || multiple || 2002–2020 || 11 Nov 2020 || 37 || align=left | Disc.: NEAT || 
|- id="2002 QK87" bgcolor=#d6d6d6
| 0 ||  || HIL || 15.93 || 4.2 km || multiple || 1995–2018 || 07 Nov 2018 || 89 || align=left | Disc.: SpacewatchAlt.: 1995 WS39 || 
|- id="2002 QN87" bgcolor=#fefefe
| 0 ||  || MBA-I || 18.0 || data-sort-value="0.75" | 750 m || multiple || 2002–2021 || 04 Jan 2021 || 90 || align=left | Disc.: NEAT || 
|- id="2002 QP87" bgcolor=#d6d6d6
| 0 ||  || MBA-O || 16.9 || 2.3 km || multiple || 2002–2020 || 08 Dec 2020 || 102 || align=left | Disc.: NEAT || 
|- id="2002 QS87" bgcolor=#fefefe
| 1 ||  || MBA-I || 18.8 || data-sort-value="0.52" | 520 m || multiple || 2002–2019 || 28 Aug 2019 || 38 || align=left | Disc.: NEAT || 
|- id="2002 QU87" bgcolor=#E9E9E9
| 0 ||  || MBA-M || 17.50 || 1.3 km || multiple || 2002–2022 || 27 Jan 2022 || 81 || align=left | Disc.: NEAT || 
|- id="2002 QC88" bgcolor=#E9E9E9
| 1 ||  || MBA-M || 18.1 || 1.3 km || multiple || 2002–2020 || 10 Oct 2020 || 65 || align=left | Disc.: NEATAlt.: 2011 OW70 || 
|- id="2002 QD88" bgcolor=#E9E9E9
| 1 ||  || MBA-M || 18.2 || data-sort-value="0.96" | 960 m || multiple || 2002–2019 || 20 Sep 2019 || 41 || align=left | Disc.: NEATAlt.: 2010 NJ62 || 
|- id="2002 QE88" bgcolor=#E9E9E9
| 1 ||  || MBA-M || 18.8 || data-sort-value="0.73" | 730 m || multiple || 2002–2019 || 25 Sep 2019 || 109 || align=left | Disc.: NEAT || 
|- id="2002 QJ88" bgcolor=#E9E9E9
| 2 ||  || MBA-M || 18.1 || data-sort-value="0.71" | 710 m || multiple || 2002–2018 || 21 Jun 2018 || 62 || align=left | Disc.: NEATAlt.: 2014 OA371 || 
|- id="2002 QQ88" bgcolor=#fefefe
| 0 ||  || MBA-I || 18.8 || data-sort-value="0.52" | 520 m || multiple || 2002–2019 || 19 Dec 2019 || 59 || align=left | Disc.: NEATAlt.: 2009 WW28 || 
|- id="2002 QY88" bgcolor=#fefefe
| 1 ||  || MBA-I || 18.9 || data-sort-value="0.49" | 490 m || multiple || 2002–2017 || 13 Nov 2017 || 48 || align=left | Disc.: NEATAlt.: 2013 ND16 || 
|- id="2002 QM89" bgcolor=#fefefe
| E ||  || MBA-I || 19.6 || data-sort-value="0.36" | 360 m || single || 2 days || 29 Aug 2002 || 8 || align=left | Disc.: NEAT || 
|- id="2002 QQ89" bgcolor=#fefefe
| 4 ||  || MBA-I || 19.0 || data-sort-value="0.47" | 470 m || multiple || 2002–2013 || 25 Sep 2013 || 25 || align=left | Disc.: NEATAlt.: 2013 RT61 || 
|- id="2002 QA90" bgcolor=#d6d6d6
| 0 ||  || MBA-O || 16.36 || 3.0 km || multiple || 2002–2022 || 27 Jan 2022 || 91 || align=left | Disc.: NEATAlt.: 2016 CB53 || 
|- id="2002 QG90" bgcolor=#fefefe
| 0 ||  || MBA-I || 18.26 || data-sort-value="0.66" | 660 m || multiple || 2002–2022 || 25 Jan 2022 || 98 || align=left | Disc.: NEAT || 
|- id="2002 QQ90" bgcolor=#E9E9E9
| 0 ||  || MBA-M || 17.3 || 1.5 km || multiple || 2002–2021 || 08 Jan 2021 || 160 || align=left | Disc.: NEATAlt.: 2011 UZ299 || 
|- id="2002 QT90" bgcolor=#d6d6d6
| 0 ||  || MBA-O || 16.60 || 2.7 km || multiple || 2002–2021 || 09 May 2021 || 123 || align=left | Disc.: NEATAlt.: 2013 WW48 || 
|- id="2002 QY90" bgcolor=#E9E9E9
| 1 ||  || MBA-M || 17.8 || data-sort-value="0.82" | 820 m || multiple || 2002–2020 || 02 Feb 2020 || 71 || align=left | Disc.: NEAT || 
|- id="2002 QC91" bgcolor=#fefefe
| 0 ||  || MBA-I || 18.69 || data-sort-value="0.54" | 540 m || multiple || 2002–2021 || 02 Dec 2021 || 75 || align=left | Disc.: NEAT || 
|- id="2002 QE91" bgcolor=#fefefe
| 1 ||  || MBA-I || 18.6 || data-sort-value="0.57" | 570 m || multiple || 2002–2019 || 28 May 2019 || 59 || align=left | Disc.: NEAT || 
|- id="2002 QF91" bgcolor=#E9E9E9
| 2 ||  || MBA-M || 18.0 || data-sort-value="0.75" | 750 m || multiple || 2002–2018 || 11 Jul 2018 || 24 || align=left | Disc.: NEAT || 
|- id="2002 QK91" bgcolor=#fefefe
| 0 ||  || MBA-I || 17.9 || data-sort-value="0.78" | 780 m || multiple || 2002–2021 || 18 Jan 2021 || 162 || align=left | Disc.: NEAT || 
|- id="2002 QS91" bgcolor=#fefefe
| 0 ||  || MBA-I || 18.1 || data-sort-value="0.71" | 710 m || multiple || 2002–2020 || 23 Jul 2020 || 99 || align=left | Disc.: NEATAlt.: 2013 OD9 || 
|- id="2002 QV91" bgcolor=#d6d6d6
| 0 ||  || MBA-O || 16.96 || 2.3 km || multiple || 2002–2021 || 03 May 2021 || 91 || align=left | Disc.: NEAT || 
|- id="2002 QW91" bgcolor=#d6d6d6
| 0 ||  || MBA-O || 17.1 || 2.1 km || multiple || 2002–2018 || 18 Aug 2018 || 31 || align=left | Disc.: NEAT || 
|- id="2002 QX91" bgcolor=#fefefe
| 0 ||  || MBA-I || 18.55 || data-sort-value="0.58" | 580 m || multiple || 2002–2021 || 08 May 2021 || 74 || align=left | Disc.: NEATAlt.: 2012 UQ6 || 
|- id="2002 QC92" bgcolor=#fefefe
| 0 ||  || MBA-I || 18.26 || data-sort-value="0.66" | 660 m || multiple || 2002–2022 || 27 Jan 2022 || 73 || align=left | Disc.: NEAT || 
|- id="2002 QE92" bgcolor=#d6d6d6
| 1 ||  || MBA-O || 17.0 || 2.2 km || multiple || 2002–2018 || 16 Sep 2018 || 63 || align=left | Disc.: NEAT || 
|- id="2002 QG92" bgcolor=#d6d6d6
| 0 ||  || MBA-O || 16.8 || 2.4 km || multiple || 2000–2019 || 28 Nov 2019 || 82 || align=left | Disc.: NEAT || 
|- id="2002 QN92" bgcolor=#d6d6d6
| 0 ||  || MBA-O || 16.99 || 2.2 km || multiple || 2002–2021 || 04 May 2021 || 108 || align=left | Disc.: NEATAlt.: 2013 WQ102 || 
|- id="2002 QP92" bgcolor=#E9E9E9
| 2 ||  || MBA-M || 18.4 || data-sort-value="0.88" | 880 m || multiple || 2002–2019 || 20 Oct 2019 || 50 || align=left | Disc.: NEAT || 
|- id="2002 QV92" bgcolor=#d6d6d6
| 0 ||  || MBA-O || 17.16 || 2.1 km || multiple || 2002–2021 || 04 Aug 2021 || 102 || align=left | Disc.: NEATAlt.: 2015 DK52 || 
|- id="2002 QD93" bgcolor=#fefefe
| 1 ||  || MBA-I || 18.4 || data-sort-value="0.62" | 620 m || multiple || 2002–2021 || 15 Apr 2021 || 33 || align=left | Disc.: NEAT || 
|- id="2002 QR93" bgcolor=#fefefe
| 0 ||  || MBA-I || 17.9 || data-sort-value="0.78" | 780 m || multiple || 2002–2020 || 12 Dec 2020 || 130 || align=left | Disc.: NEATAlt.: 2011 AE62 || 
|- id="2002 QW93" bgcolor=#E9E9E9
| 0 ||  || MBA-M || 16.9 || 1.8 km || multiple || 2002–2021 || 11 Jan 2021 || 210 || align=left | Disc.: NEATAlt.: 2011 SE118 || 
|- id="2002 QJ94" bgcolor=#E9E9E9
| 0 ||  || MBA-M || 17.27 || 1.5 km || multiple || 2002–2022 || 27 Jan 2022 || 161 || align=left | Disc.: NEATAlt.: 2015 MU126 || 
|- id="2002 QL94" bgcolor=#E9E9E9
| 2 ||  || MBA-M || 18.3 || 1.2 km || multiple || 2002–2020 || 14 Sep 2020 || 32 || align=left | Disc.: NEAT || 
|- id="2002 QM94" bgcolor=#FA8072
| 1 ||  || MCA || 19.20 || data-sort-value="0.61" | 610 m || multiple || 2002–2015 || 09 Sep 2015 || 19 || align=left | Disc.: NEAT || 
|- id="2002 QN94" bgcolor=#E9E9E9
| 0 ||  || MBA-M || 17.4 || 1.4 km || multiple || 1998–2021 || 11 Jan 2021 || 129 || align=left | Disc.: NEAT || 
|- id="2002 QS94" bgcolor=#E9E9E9
| 0 ||  || MBA-M || 16.9 || 1.2 km || multiple || 2002–2021 || 07 Jan 2021 || 169 || align=left | Disc.: NEATAlt.: 2013 DF11 || 
|- id="2002 QV94" bgcolor=#E9E9E9
| – ||  || MBA-M || 18.0 || data-sort-value="0.75" | 750 m || single || 23 days || 09 Sep 2002 || 15 || align=left | Disc.: NEAT || 
|- id="2002 QW94" bgcolor=#E9E9E9
| 1 ||  || MBA-M || 18.2 || data-sort-value="0.68" | 680 m || multiple || 2002–2018 || 13 Aug 2018 || 65 || align=left | Disc.: NEATAlt.: 2014 NZ58 || 
|- id="2002 QX94" bgcolor=#E9E9E9
| 1 ||  || MBA-M || 17.8 || 1.2 km || multiple || 2002–2019 || 05 Jul 2019 || 57 || align=left | Disc.: NEAT || 
|- id="2002 QA95" bgcolor=#d6d6d6
| 0 ||  || MBA-O || 17.4 || 1.8 km || multiple || 2002–2018 || 30 Sep 2018 || 44 || align=left | Disc.: NEAT || 
|- id="2002 QG95" bgcolor=#d6d6d6
| 0 ||  || MBA-O || 17.02 || 2.2 km || multiple || 1992–2021 || 08 May 2021 || 118 || align=left | Disc.: NEAT || 
|- id="2002 QM95" bgcolor=#E9E9E9
| 0 ||  || MBA-M || 17.1 || 1.1 km || multiple || 2002–2021 || 18 Jan 2021 || 106 || align=left | Disc.: NEAT || 
|- id="2002 QN95" bgcolor=#E9E9E9
| 0 ||  || MBA-M || 17.8 || 1.5 km || multiple || 2002–2020 || 08 Oct 2020 || 91 || align=left | Disc.: NEAT || 
|- id="2002 QP95" bgcolor=#fefefe
| 0 ||  || MBA-I || 18.30 || data-sort-value="0.65" | 650 m || multiple || 2002–2021 || 08 Apr 2021 || 80 || align=left | Disc.: NEAT || 
|- id="2002 QR95" bgcolor=#d6d6d6
| 0 ||  || MBA-O || 16.64 || 2.6 km || multiple || 2001–2022 || 25 Jan 2022 || 116 || align=left | Disc.: NEAT || 
|- id="2002 QW95" bgcolor=#FA8072
| 1 ||  || MCA || 18.8 || data-sort-value="0.52" | 520 m || multiple || 2002–2020 || 25 Jan 2020 || 65 || align=left | Disc.: NEATAlt.: 2012 VO78 || 
|- id="2002 QZ95" bgcolor=#E9E9E9
| 0 ||  || MBA-M || 17.7 || 1.2 km || multiple || 2002–2018 || 18 Mar 2018 || 38 || align=left | Disc.: NEAT || 
|- id="2002 QF96" bgcolor=#E9E9E9
| 0 ||  || MBA-M || 17.6 || data-sort-value="0.90" | 900 m || multiple || 2002–2019 || 28 Nov 2019 || 87 || align=left | Disc.: NEATAlt.: 2014 KG32 || 
|- id="2002 QJ96" bgcolor=#fefefe
| 0 ||  || MBA-I || 18.5 || data-sort-value="0.59" | 590 m || multiple || 2002–2020 || 16 Dec 2020 || 28 || align=left | Disc.: NEAT || 
|- id="2002 QW96" bgcolor=#fefefe
| 0 ||  || MBA-I || 18.9 || data-sort-value="0.49" | 490 m || multiple || 2002–2019 || 29 Oct 2019 || 61 || align=left | Disc.: NEAT || 
|- id="2002 QA97" bgcolor=#E9E9E9
| 0 ||  || MBA-M || 17.6 || 1.3 km || multiple || 2002–2020 || 10 Dec 2020 || 42 || align=left | Disc.: NEAT || 
|- id="2002 QD97" bgcolor=#d6d6d6
| 0 ||  || MBA-O || 16.1 || 3.4 km || multiple || 2002–2021 || 18 Jan 2021 || 131 || align=left | Disc.: NEAT || 
|- id="2002 QE97" bgcolor=#fefefe
| 4 ||  || MBA-I || 19.1 || data-sort-value="0.45" | 450 m || multiple || 2002–2018 || 16 Apr 2018 || 17 || align=left | Disc.: NEAT || 
|- id="2002 QH97" bgcolor=#d6d6d6
| 0 ||  || MBA-O || 16.1 || 3.4 km || multiple || 2002–2021 || 18 Jan 2021 || 159 || align=left | Disc.: NEATAlt.: 2013 QZ39 || 
|- id="2002 QK97" bgcolor=#fefefe
| E ||  || MBA-I || 19.1 || data-sort-value="0.45" | 450 m || single || 3 days || 18 Aug 2002 || 9 || align=left | Disc.: NEAT || 
|- id="2002 QM97" bgcolor=#fefefe
| 1 ||  || MBA-I || 18.6 || data-sort-value="0.57" | 570 m || multiple || 2002–2020 || 14 Dec 2020 || 75 || align=left | Disc.: NEAT || 
|- id="2002 QR97" bgcolor=#fefefe
| 0 ||  || MBA-I || 17.95 || data-sort-value="0.76" | 760 m || multiple || 2002–2021 || 29 Oct 2021 || 113 || align=left | Disc.: NEAT || 
|- id="2002 QY97" bgcolor=#d6d6d6
| – ||  || MBA-O || 18.2 || 1.3 km || single || 37 days || 04 Sep 2002 || 26 || align=left | Disc.: NEAT || 
|- id="2002 QJ98" bgcolor=#E9E9E9
| 2 ||  || MBA-M || 18.2 || data-sort-value="0.68" | 680 m || multiple || 2002–2020 || 15 Feb 2020 || 57 || align=left | Disc.: NEAT || 
|- id="2002 QK98" bgcolor=#E9E9E9
| 0 ||  || MBA-M || 17.8 || data-sort-value="0.82" | 820 m || multiple || 2002–2020 || 09 Dec 2020 || 67 || align=left | Disc.: NEAT || 
|- id="2002 QO98" bgcolor=#d6d6d6
| 0 ||  || MBA-O || 17.0 || 2.2 km || multiple || 2002–2019 || 20 Dec 2019 || 74 || align=left | Disc.: NEAT || 
|- id="2002 QR98" bgcolor=#E9E9E9
| 3 ||  || MBA-M || 18.1 || 1.3 km || multiple || 2002–2020 || 16 Sep 2020 || 47 || align=left | Disc.: NEATAlt.: 2011 QX14 || 
|- id="2002 QS98" bgcolor=#E9E9E9
| 0 ||  || MBA-M || 17.86 || data-sort-value="0.80" | 800 m || multiple || 2002–2021 || 08 May 2021 || 101 || align=left | Disc.: NEAT || 
|- id="2002 QU98" bgcolor=#FA8072
| 0 ||  || MCA || 19.0 || data-sort-value="0.47" | 470 m || multiple || 2002–2019 || 31 May 2019 || 58 || align=left | Disc.: NEATAlt.: 2012 DL54, 2016 RO19 || 
|- id="2002 QC99" bgcolor=#E9E9E9
| 0 ||  || MBA-M || 17.62 || 1.3 km || multiple || 1997–2020 || 06 Dec 2020 || 166 || align=left | Disc.: NEATAlt.: 2011 SK8 || 
|- id="2002 QD99" bgcolor=#fefefe
| 0 ||  || MBA-I || 18.88 || data-sort-value="0.50" | 500 m || multiple || 2002–2021 || 04 Sep 2021 || 67 || align=left | Disc.: NEATAlt.: 2006 SS181 || 
|- id="2002 QE99" bgcolor=#d6d6d6
| 1 ||  || MBA-O || 16.0 || 3.5 km || multiple || 2002–2020 || 16 May 2020 || 160 || align=left | Disc.: NEAT || 
|- id="2002 QF99" bgcolor=#fefefe
| 0 ||  || MBA-I || 18.4 || data-sort-value="0.62" | 620 m || multiple || 2002–2020 || 10 Sep 2020 || 63 || align=left | Disc.: NEAT || 
|- id="2002 QG99" bgcolor=#E9E9E9
| 2 ||  || MBA-M || 18.6 || data-sort-value="0.57" | 570 m || multiple || 2002–2019 || 29 Nov 2019 || 49 || align=left | Disc.: NEAT || 
|- id="2002 QH99" bgcolor=#E9E9E9
| 1 ||  || MBA-M || 18.3 || data-sort-value="0.92" | 920 m || multiple || 2002–2019 || 30 Aug 2019 || 74 || align=left | Disc.: NEAT || 
|- id="2002 QL99" bgcolor=#E9E9E9
| 0 ||  || MBA-M || 17.8 || data-sort-value="0.82" | 820 m || multiple || 2002–2020 || 23 Jan 2020 || 73 || align=left | Disc.: NEAT || 
|- id="2002 QO99" bgcolor=#fefefe
| 0 ||  || MBA-I || 17.8 || data-sort-value="0.82" | 820 m || multiple || 2002–2021 || 14 Jan 2021 || 196 || align=left | Disc.: NEATAlt.: 2015 HS175 || 
|- id="2002 QU99" bgcolor=#E9E9E9
| 0 ||  || MBA-M || 17.5 || 1.3 km || multiple || 2002–2020 || 09 Dec 2020 || 68 || align=left | Disc.: NEAT || 
|- id="2002 QV99" bgcolor=#d6d6d6
| 0 ||  || MBA-O || 16.78 || 2.5 km || multiple || 2002–2021 || 03 May 2021 || 76 || align=left | Disc.: NEAT || 
|- id="2002 QX99" bgcolor=#fefefe
| 0 ||  || MBA-I || 18.11 || data-sort-value="0.71" | 710 m || multiple || 2002–2021 || 01 Nov 2021 || 79 || align=left | Disc.: NEAT || 
|- id="2002 QD100" bgcolor=#fefefe
| 1 ||  || HUN || 18.70 || data-sort-value="0.54" | 540 m || multiple || 2002–2018 || 12 Oct 2018 || 44 || align=left | Disc.: NEAT || 
|- id="2002 QE100" bgcolor=#fefefe
| 0 ||  || MBA-I || 18.1 || data-sort-value="0.71" | 710 m || multiple || 2002–2020 || 17 Nov 2020 || 120 || align=left | Disc.: NEATAlt.: 2006 WF80 || 
|- id="2002 QJ100" bgcolor=#fefefe
| 0 ||  || MBA-I || 18.82 || data-sort-value="0.51" | 510 m || multiple || 2002–2021 || 02 Oct 2021 || 28 || align=left | Disc.: NEATAlt.: 2006 SJ272 || 
|- id="2002 QM100" bgcolor=#d6d6d6
| 0 ||  || MBA-O || 15.77 || 3.9 km || multiple || 2002–2022 || 25 Jan 2022 || 223 || align=left | Disc.: NEATAlt.: 2012 HD72 || 
|- id="2002 QO100" bgcolor=#d6d6d6
| 1 ||  || MBA-O || 16.0 || 3.5 km || multiple || 2002–2019 || 03 Jan 2019 || 95 || align=left | Disc.: NEATAlt.: 2010 RV9 || 
|- id="2002 QQ100" bgcolor=#d6d6d6
| 0 ||  || MBA-O || 17.0 || 2.2 km || multiple || 2002–2019 || 05 Nov 2019 || 37 || align=left | Disc.: NEAT || 
|- id="2002 QY100" bgcolor=#E9E9E9
| 0 ||  || MBA-M || 17.6 || 1.3 km || multiple || 2001–2019 || 31 Oct 2019 || 185 || align=left | Disc.: NEATAlt.: 2014 HV149 || 
|- id="2002 QD101" bgcolor=#E9E9E9
| 2 ||  || MBA-M || 17.7 || 1.6 km || multiple || 2002–2016 || 06 Oct 2016 || 38 || align=left | Disc.: NEAT || 
|- id="2002 QH101" bgcolor=#E9E9E9
| 1 ||  || MBA-M || 17.8 || 1.5 km || multiple || 2002–2020 || 11 Oct 2020 || 76 || align=left | Disc.: NEAT || 
|- id="2002 QJ101" bgcolor=#E9E9E9
| 0 ||  || MBA-M || 17.32 || 1.9 km || multiple || 2002–2021 || 28 Nov 2021 || 127 || align=left | Disc.: NEAT || 
|- id="2002 QK101" bgcolor=#d6d6d6
| 0 ||  || MBA-O || 15.9 || 3.7 km || multiple || 2002–2020 || 23 Dec 2020 || 145 || align=left | Disc.: NEATAlt.: 2012 GT38 || 
|- id="2002 QN101" bgcolor=#fefefe
| 1 ||  || MBA-I || 19.0 || data-sort-value="0.47" | 470 m || multiple || 2002–2020 || 05 Nov 2020 || 63 || align=left | Disc.: NEATAdded on 22 July 2020Alt.: 2006 WX47 || 
|- id="2002 QQ101" bgcolor=#d6d6d6
| 0 ||  || MBA-O || 15.8 || 3.9 km || multiple || 2000–2021 || 08 Jun 2021 || 349 || align=left | Disc.: NEAT || 
|- id="2002 QS101" bgcolor=#d6d6d6
| 0 ||  || MBA-O || 15.9 || 3.7 km || multiple || 2002–2021 || 14 Jan 2021 || 199 || align=left | Disc.: NEATAlt.: 2013 PZ37 || 
|- id="2002 QX101" bgcolor=#d6d6d6
| 0 ||  || MBA-O || 16.5 || 2.8 km || multiple || 2002–2020 || 16 May 2020 || 121 || align=left | Disc.: NEATAlt.: 2012 QT32 || 
|- id="2002 QY101" bgcolor=#fefefe
| 0 ||  || MBA-I || 18.40 || data-sort-value="0.62" | 620 m || multiple || 2002–2021 || 07 Nov 2021 || 82 || align=left | Disc.: NEAT || 
|- id="2002 QD102" bgcolor=#E9E9E9
| 0 ||  || MBA-M || 16.93 || 1.2 km || multiple || 2002–2021 || 02 May 2021 || 130 || align=left | Disc.: NEAT || 
|- id="2002 QG102" bgcolor=#E9E9E9
| 3 ||  || MBA-M || 17.4 || data-sort-value="0.98" | 980 m || multiple || 2002–2014 || 23 Aug 2014 || 21 || align=left | Disc.: NEATAlt.: 2014 QL155 || 
|- id="2002 QU102" bgcolor=#d6d6d6
| 0 ||  || MBA-O || 16.6 || 2.7 km || multiple || 2002–2021 || 13 May 2021 || 69 || align=left | Disc.: NEAT || 
|- id="2002 QE103" bgcolor=#d6d6d6
| 0 ||  || MBA-O || 16.11 || 3.3 km || multiple || 2002–2021 || 29 Jul 2021 || 170 || align=left | Disc.: NEATAlt.: 2011 HX55 || 
|- id="2002 QF103" bgcolor=#fefefe
| 0 ||  || MBA-I || 18.0 || data-sort-value="0.75" | 750 m || multiple || 2002–2020 || 07 Dec 2020 || 64 || align=left | Disc.: NEAT || 
|- id="2002 QH103" bgcolor=#d6d6d6
| 0 ||  || MBA-O || 17.0 || 2.2 km || multiple || 2002–2018 || 12 Nov 2018 || 44 || align=left | Disc.: NEAT || 
|- id="2002 QJ103" bgcolor=#fefefe
| 1 ||  || MBA-I || 18.5 || data-sort-value="0.59" | 590 m || multiple || 2002–2019 || 28 Nov 2019 || 62 || align=left | Disc.: NEAT || 
|- id="2002 QV103" bgcolor=#d6d6d6
| 0 ||  || MBA-O || 17.71 || 1.6 km || multiple || 2002–2021 || 08 May 2021 || 48 || align=left | Disc.: NEAT || 
|- id="2002 QW103" bgcolor=#d6d6d6
| 1 ||  || MBA-O || 16.4 || 2.9 km || multiple || 2002–2019 || 01 Oct 2019 || 81 || align=left | Disc.: NEAT || 
|- id="2002 QZ103" bgcolor=#fefefe
| 0 ||  || MBA-I || 17.9 || data-sort-value="0.78" | 780 m || multiple || 1993–2021 || 14 Jan 2021 || 118 || align=left | Disc.: NEATAlt.: 2013 WQ37 || 
|- id="2002 QE104" bgcolor=#fefefe
| 1 ||  || MBA-I || 18.8 || data-sort-value="0.52" | 520 m || multiple || 2002–2019 || 06 Sep 2019 || 55 || align=left | Disc.: NEAT || 
|- id="2002 QK104" bgcolor=#d6d6d6
| 0 ||  || MBA-O || 16.2 || 3.2 km || multiple || 2002–2020 || 17 Apr 2020 || 121 || align=left | Disc.: NEAT || 
|- id="2002 QS104" bgcolor=#E9E9E9
| 0 ||  || MBA-M || 18.36 || 1.2 km || multiple || 2002–2022 || 07 Jan 2022 || 52 || align=left | Disc.: NEAT || 
|- id="2002 QV104" bgcolor=#FA8072
| 3 ||  || MCA || 19.5 || data-sort-value="0.37" | 370 m || multiple || 2002–2012 || 22 Sep 2012 || 23 || align=left | Disc.: NEAT || 
|- id="2002 QX104" bgcolor=#fefefe
| – ||  || MBA-I || 20.1 || data-sort-value="0.28" | 280 m || single || 9 days || 26 Aug 2002 || 8 || align=left | Disc.: NEAT || 
|- id="2002 QF105" bgcolor=#fefefe
| 0 ||  || MBA-I || 18.0 || data-sort-value="0.75" | 750 m || multiple || 2002–2019 || 25 Nov 2019 || 113 || align=left | Disc.: NEATAlt.: 2009 SH265 || 
|- id="2002 QK105" bgcolor=#E9E9E9
| 0 ||  || MBA-M || 17.4 || data-sort-value="0.98" | 980 m || multiple || 2002–2019 || 29 Nov 2019 || 99 || align=left | Disc.: NEATAlt.: 2013 ER96, 2013 EB154, 2015 XS24 || 
|- id="2002 QM105" bgcolor=#E9E9E9
| 0 ||  || MBA-M || 17.1 || 2.1 km || multiple || 1993–2020 || 16 Aug 2020 || 90 || align=left | Disc.: NEAT || 
|- id="2002 QQ105" bgcolor=#fefefe
| 0 ||  || MBA-I || 18.8 || data-sort-value="0.52" | 520 m || multiple || 2002–2019 || 24 Aug 2019 || 73 || align=left | Disc.: NEATAlt.: 2009 WR47 || 
|- id="2002 QT105" bgcolor=#fefefe
| 0 ||  || MBA-I || 18.93 || data-sort-value="0.49" | 490 m || multiple || 2002–2021 || 04 Nov 2021 || 46 || align=left | Disc.: NEAT || 
|- id="2002 QU105" bgcolor=#fefefe
| 0 ||  || MBA-I || 18.07 || data-sort-value="0.72" | 720 m || multiple || 2002–2021 || 27 Nov 2021 || 133 || align=left | Disc.: NEAT || 
|- id="2002 QX105" bgcolor=#d6d6d6
| 0 ||  || MBA-O || 16.1 || 3.4 km || multiple || 2002–2020 || 24 Dec 2020 || 126 || align=left | Disc.: NEAT || 
|- id="2002 QY105" bgcolor=#d6d6d6
| 0 ||  || MBA-O || 16.8 || 2.4 km || multiple || 2002–2020 || 28 Apr 2020 || 53 || align=left | Disc.: NEATAlt.: 2009 AG56 || 
|- id="2002 QA106" bgcolor=#fefefe
| 0 ||  || MBA-I || 18.52 || data-sort-value="0.59" | 590 m || multiple || 2002–2021 || 15 Apr 2021 || 68 || align=left | Disc.: NEAT || 
|- id="2002 QK106" bgcolor=#FA8072
| 2 ||  || MCA || 20.1 || data-sort-value="0.28" | 280 m || multiple || 2002–2012 || 09 Oct 2012 || 26 || align=left | Disc.: NEAT || 
|- id="2002 QN106" bgcolor=#fefefe
| 2 ||  || MBA-I || 18.5 || data-sort-value="0.59" | 590 m || multiple || 2002–2020 || 15 Dec 2020 || 55 || align=left | Disc.: NEAT || 
|- id="2002 QP106" bgcolor=#E9E9E9
| 0 ||  || MBA-M || 17.69 || data-sort-value="0.86" | 860 m || multiple || 2002–2021 || 15 Apr 2021 || 96 || align=left | Disc.: NEAT || 
|- id="2002 QQ106" bgcolor=#fefefe
| 2 ||  || MBA-I || 18.5 || data-sort-value="0.59" | 590 m || multiple || 2002–2019 || 05 Jul 2019 || 45 || align=left | Disc.: NEAT || 
|- id="2002 QZ106" bgcolor=#E9E9E9
| 0 ||  || MBA-M || 17.2 || 1.5 km || multiple || 1998–2020 || 11 Dec 2020 || 187 || align=left | Disc.: NEAT || 
|- id="2002 QG107" bgcolor=#fefefe
| 2 ||  || MBA-I || 18.9 || data-sort-value="0.49" | 490 m || multiple || 2002–2019 || 29 Nov 2019 || 51 || align=left | Disc.: NEAT || 
|- id="2002 QO107" bgcolor=#E9E9E9
| 0 ||  || MBA-M || 17.3 || 1.5 km || multiple || 2002–2020 || 16 Nov 2020 || 88 || align=left | Disc.: NEAT || 
|- id="2002 QQ107" bgcolor=#fefefe
| 1 ||  || MBA-I || 18.8 || data-sort-value="0.52" | 520 m || multiple || 2002–2019 || 27 Oct 2019 || 50 || align=left | Disc.: NEAT || 
|- id="2002 QU107" bgcolor=#fefefe
| 0 ||  || MBA-I || 18.9 || data-sort-value="0.49" | 490 m || multiple || 2002–2020 || 14 Dec 2020 || 62 || align=left | Disc.: NEATAlt.: 2009 MC3 || 
|- id="2002 QV107" bgcolor=#E9E9E9
| 0 ||  || MBA-M || 16.9 || 1.8 km || multiple || 2001–2020 || 20 Dec 2020 || 126 || align=left | Disc.: NEATAlt.: 2013 BH64 || 
|- id="2002 QY107" bgcolor=#d6d6d6
| 0 ||  || MBA-O || 16.7 || 2.5 km || multiple || 2002–2019 || 02 Nov 2019 || 212 || align=left | Disc.: NEATAlt.: 2014 WW455 || 
|- id="2002 QE108" bgcolor=#E9E9E9
| 0 ||  || MBA-M || 16.62 || 1.4 km || multiple || 2002–2021 || 06 Apr 2021 || 290 || align=left | Disc.: NEATAlt.: 2013 CP18 || 
|- id="2002 QH108" bgcolor=#fefefe
| 1 ||  || MBA-I || 18.7 || data-sort-value="0.54" | 540 m || multiple || 2002–2020 || 14 Dec 2020 || 40 || align=left | Disc.: NEATAlt.: 2016 SG18 || 
|- id="2002 QN108" bgcolor=#E9E9E9
| 0 ||  || MBA-M || 17.0 || 1.7 km || multiple || 2002–2021 || 09 Jan 2021 || 160 || align=left | Disc.: NEATAlt.: 2015 MC118 || 
|- id="2002 QR108" bgcolor=#E9E9E9
| 1 ||  || MBA-M || 17.7 || data-sort-value="0.86" | 860 m || multiple || 2002–2019 || 28 Nov 2019 || 39 || align=left | Disc.: NEAT || 
|- id="2002 QA109" bgcolor=#fefefe
| 0 ||  || MBA-I || 18.1 || data-sort-value="0.71" | 710 m || multiple || 2002–2020 || 19 Jul 2020 || 71 || align=left | Disc.: NEAT || 
|- id="2002 QD109" bgcolor=#E9E9E9
| 0 ||  || MBA-M || 18.2 || data-sort-value="0.68" | 680 m || multiple || 1994–2019 || 19 Dec 2019 || 33 || align=left | Disc.: NEAT || 
|- id="2002 QH109" bgcolor=#FA8072
| 3 ||  || MCA || 19.8 || data-sort-value="0.33" | 330 m || multiple || 2002–2012 || 26 Aug 2012 || 23 || align=left | Disc.: NEAT || 
|- id="2002 QK109" bgcolor=#fefefe
| 2 ||  || MBA-I || 18.6 || data-sort-value="0.57" | 570 m || multiple || 2002–2020 || 08 Nov 2020 || 70 || align=left | Disc.: NEAT || 
|- id="2002 QN109" bgcolor=#fefefe
| 0 ||  || MBA-I || 18.81 || data-sort-value="0.51" | 510 m || multiple || 2002–2019 || 26 Sep 2019 || 288 || align=left | Disc.: NEAT || 
|- id="2002 QV109" bgcolor=#fefefe
| 0 ||  || MBA-I || 18.1 || data-sort-value="0.71" | 710 m || multiple || 2002–2019 || 03 Jul 2019 || 64 || align=left | Disc.: NEAT || 
|- id="2002 QF110" bgcolor=#E9E9E9
| 0 ||  || MBA-M || 17.14 || 1.6 km || multiple || 2002–2021 || 07 Feb 2021 || 131 || align=left | Disc.: NEAT || 
|- id="2002 QK110" bgcolor=#d6d6d6
| 0 ||  || MBA-O || 17.12 || 2.1 km || multiple || 2002–2019 || 30 Nov 2019 || 75 || align=left | Disc.: NEATAlt.: 2019 RK26 || 
|- id="2002 QM110" bgcolor=#E9E9E9
| 1 ||  || MBA-M || 17.9 || 1.1 km || multiple || 2002–2015 || 02 Nov 2015 || 62 || align=left | Disc.: NEATAlt.: 2015 OY35 || 
|- id="2002 QN110" bgcolor=#fefefe
| 2 ||  || MBA-I || 19.0 || data-sort-value="0.47" | 470 m || multiple || 2002–2019 || 27 May 2019 || 36 || align=left | Disc.: NEAT || 
|- id="2002 QT110" bgcolor=#E9E9E9
| 1 ||  || MBA-M || 17.7 || data-sort-value="0.86" | 860 m || multiple || 2002–2021 || 17 Jan 2021 || 40 || align=left | Disc.: NEAT || 
|- id="2002 QY110" bgcolor=#fefefe
| 0 ||  || MBA-I || 18.2 || data-sort-value="0.68" | 680 m || multiple || 2002–2021 || 18 Jan 2021 || 124 || align=left | Disc.: NEAT || 
|- id="2002 QC111" bgcolor=#E9E9E9
| 1 ||  || MBA-M || 18.2 || data-sort-value="0.68" | 680 m || multiple || 2002–2020 || 21 Jan 2020 || 74 || align=left | Disc.: NEAT || 
|- id="2002 QF111" bgcolor=#d6d6d6
| 0 ||  || MBA-O || 17.0 || 2.2 km || multiple || 2002–2021 || 04 Jan 2021 || 52 || align=left | Disc.: NEAT || 
|- id="2002 QG111" bgcolor=#fefefe
| 0 ||  || MBA-I || 18.2 || data-sort-value="0.68" | 680 m || multiple || 1995–2020 || 17 Dec 2020 || 96 || align=left | Disc.: NEAT || 
|- id="2002 QM111" bgcolor=#fefefe
| 0 ||  || MBA-I || 18.75 || data-sort-value="0.53" | 530 m || multiple || 2002–2021 || 28 Jul 2021 || 96 || align=left | Disc.: NEAT || 
|- id="2002 QP111" bgcolor=#d6d6d6
| 5 ||  || MBA-O || 17.55 || 1.8 km || multiple || 2002-2016 || 01 Apr 2016 || 24 || align=left | Disc.: NEAT || 
|- id="2002 QR111" bgcolor=#d6d6d6
| 0 ||  || MBA-O || 16.4 || 2.9 km || multiple || 2002–2020 || 11 Nov 2020 || 92 || align=left | Disc.: NEAT || 
|- id="2002 QD112" bgcolor=#fefefe
| 3 ||  || MBA-I || 18.7 || data-sort-value="0.54" | 540 m || multiple || 2002–2019 || 03 Sep 2019 || 28 || align=left | Disc.: NEAT || 
|- id="2002 QE112" bgcolor=#fefefe
| 0 ||  || MBA-I || 18.8 || data-sort-value="0.52" | 520 m || multiple || 2002–2019 || 20 Dec 2019 || 54 || align=left | Disc.: NEATAlt.: 2009 WL3 || 
|- id="2002 QL112" bgcolor=#fefefe
| 0 ||  || MBA-I || 18.8 || data-sort-value="0.52" | 520 m || multiple || 2002–2019 || 20 Dec 2019 || 40 || align=left | Disc.: NEAT || 
|- id="2002 QP112" bgcolor=#d6d6d6
| 0 ||  || MBA-O || 17.1 || 2.1 km || multiple || 2002–2019 || 05 Oct 2019 || 31 || align=left | Disc.: NEAT || 
|- id="2002 QS112" bgcolor=#E9E9E9
| 3 ||  || MBA-M || 18.1 || data-sort-value="0.71" | 710 m || multiple || 2002–2018 || 11 Jul 2018 || 26 || align=left | Disc.: NEAT || 
|- id="2002 QT112" bgcolor=#fefefe
| 0 ||  || MBA-I || 18.3 || data-sort-value="0.65" | 650 m || multiple || 2002–2020 || 10 Nov 2020 || 35 || align=left | Disc.: NEAT || 
|- id="2002 QY112" bgcolor=#d6d6d6
| 0 ||  || MBA-O || 16.8 || 2.4 km || multiple || 2002–2020 || 08 Dec 2020 || 52 || align=left | Disc.: NEAT || 
|- id="2002 QA113" bgcolor=#fefefe
| 0 ||  || MBA-I || 17.97 || data-sort-value="0.76" | 760 m || multiple || 2002–2021 || 13 Jul 2021 || 57 || align=left | Disc.: NEATAlt.: 2014 XN10 || 
|- id="2002 QC113" bgcolor=#E9E9E9
| 0 ||  || MBA-M || 17.8 || 1.5 km || multiple || 2002–2020 || 10 Aug 2020 || 50 || align=left | Disc.: NEATAlt.: 2016 TD83 || 
|- id="2002 QH113" bgcolor=#d6d6d6
| 1 ||  || MBA-O || 16.9 || 2.3 km || multiple || 2002–2021 || 06 Apr 2021 || 40 || align=left | Disc.: NEAT || 
|- id="2002 QM113" bgcolor=#d6d6d6
| 0 ||  || MBA-O || 17.0 || 2.2 km || multiple || 2002–2019 || 24 Oct 2019 || 71 || align=left | Disc.: NEATAlt.: 2013 PZ || 
|- id="2002 QS113" bgcolor=#d6d6d6
| 0 ||  || MBA-O || 17.8 || 1.5 km || multiple || 2002–2016 || 01 Jul 2016 || 33 || align=left | Disc.: NEATAlt.: 2011 HQ71 || 
|- id="2002 QV113" bgcolor=#fefefe
| – ||  || MBA-I || 19.3 || data-sort-value="0.41" | 410 m || single || 28 days || 12 Sep 2002 || 17 || align=left | Disc.: NEAT || 
|- id="2002 QW113" bgcolor=#E9E9E9
| – ||  || MBA-M || 18.5 || data-sort-value="0.59" | 590 m || single || 27 days || 12 Sep 2002 || 18 || align=left | Disc.: NEAT || 
|- id="2002 QC114" bgcolor=#fefefe
| 0 ||  || MBA-I || 18.3 || data-sort-value="0.65" | 650 m || multiple || 2002–2020 || 11 Dec 2020 || 74 || align=left | Disc.: NEAT || 
|- id="2002 QJ114" bgcolor=#FA8072
| 0 ||  || MCA || 19.1 || data-sort-value="0.45" | 450 m || multiple || 2002–2020 || 19 Oct 2020 || 83 || align=left | Disc.: NEAT || 
|- id="2002 QR114" bgcolor=#d6d6d6
| 0 ||  || MBA-O || 16.8 || 2.4 km || multiple || 2002–2019 || 03 Oct 2019 || 78 || align=left | Disc.: NEATAlt.: 2013 PN1 || 
|- id="2002 QU114" bgcolor=#E9E9E9
| 0 ||  || MBA-M || 18.0 || 1.4 km || multiple || 2002–2016 || 30 Oct 2016 || 50 || align=left | Disc.: NEAT || 
|- id="2002 QC115" bgcolor=#fefefe
| 0 ||  || MBA-I || 18.2 || data-sort-value="0.68" | 680 m || multiple || 2002–2020 || 11 Oct 2020 || 65 || align=left | Disc.: NEAT || 
|- id="2002 QH115" bgcolor=#fefefe
| 0 ||  || MBA-I || 18.50 || data-sort-value="0.59" | 590 m || multiple || 2002–2021 || 26 Nov 2021 || 30 || align=left | Disc.: NEATAlt.: 2006 SS263 || 
|- id="2002 QL115" bgcolor=#d6d6d6
| 0 ||  || MBA-O || 16.4 || 2.9 km || multiple || 2002–2019 || 02 Dec 2019 || 79 || align=left | Disc.: NEATAlt.: 2013 PX33 || 
|- id="2002 QP115" bgcolor=#d6d6d6
| 1 ||  || MBA-O || 17.2 || 2.0 km || multiple || 2002–2019 || 25 Sep 2019 || 68 || align=left | Disc.: NEATAlt.: 2008 SG75 || 
|- id="2002 QW115" bgcolor=#fefefe
| 0 ||  || MBA-I || 18.2 || data-sort-value="0.68" | 680 m || multiple || 2002–2020 || 29 Jun 2020 || 70 || align=left | Disc.: NEAT || 
|- id="2002 QA116" bgcolor=#fefefe
| 0 ||  || MBA-I || 17.8 || data-sort-value="0.82" | 820 m || multiple || 2002–2020 || 11 Dec 2020 || 76 || align=left | Disc.: NEAT || 
|- id="2002 QF116" bgcolor=#d6d6d6
| 0 ||  || MBA-O || 17.1 || 2.1 km || multiple || 2002–2019 || 24 Oct 2019 || 54 || align=left | Disc.: NEATAlt.: 2008 RC12 || 
|- id="2002 QG116" bgcolor=#E9E9E9
| 0 ||  || MBA-M || 17.0 || 1.2 km || multiple || 2002–2021 || 24 Jan 2021 || 188 || align=left | Disc.: NEATAlt.: 2011 YL70 || 
|- id="2002 QK116" bgcolor=#E9E9E9
| 0 ||  || MBA-M || 17.3 || 1.5 km || multiple || 2002–2021 || 04 Jan 2021 || 109 || align=left | Disc.: NEATAlt.: 2011 UG315 || 
|- id="2002 QL116" bgcolor=#d6d6d6
| 0 ||  || MBA-O || 16.5 || 2.8 km || multiple || 2002–2020 || 01 Aug 2020 || 89 || align=left | Disc.: NEAT || 
|- id="2002 QN116" bgcolor=#d6d6d6
| 5 ||  || MBA-O || 17.5 || 1.8 km || multiple || 2002–2018 || 14 Sep 2018 || 24 || align=left | Disc.: NEAT || 
|- id="2002 QU116" bgcolor=#fefefe
| 0 ||  || MBA-I || 19.72 || data-sort-value="0.34" | 340 m || multiple || 2002–2021 || 11 Sep 2021 || 37 || align=left | Disc.: NEATAlt.: 2018 SO20 || 
|- id="2002 QW116" bgcolor=#E9E9E9
| 0 ||  || MBA-M || 17.3 || 1.5 km || multiple || 2002–2021 || 14 Jan 2021 || 109 || align=left | Disc.: NEATAlt.: 2011 UV358 || 
|- id="2002 QD117" bgcolor=#fefefe
| 0 ||  || MBA-I || 18.06 || data-sort-value="0.73" | 730 m || multiple || 2002–2021 || 25 Nov 2021 || 126 || align=left | Disc.: NEAT || 
|- id="2002 QG117" bgcolor=#E9E9E9
| 0 ||  || MBA-M || 17.0 || 1.7 km || multiple || 2002–2021 || 12 Jan 2021 || 191 || align=left | Disc.: NEAT || 
|- id="2002 QJ117" bgcolor=#fefefe
| 3 ||  || MBA-I || 19.1 || data-sort-value="0.45" | 450 m || multiple || 2002–2019 || 02 Nov 2019 || 37 || align=left | Disc.: NEAT || 
|- id="2002 QK117" bgcolor=#fefefe
| 0 ||  || MBA-I || 18.5 || data-sort-value="0.59" | 590 m || multiple || 2002–2020 || 05 Nov 2020 || 97 || align=left | Disc.: NEAT || 
|- id="2002 QO117" bgcolor=#E9E9E9
| 1 ||  || MBA-M || 17.96 || data-sort-value="0.76" | 760 m || multiple || 2001–2021 || 13 Feb 2021 || 30 || align=left | Disc.: NEAT || 
|- id="2002 QR117" bgcolor=#fefefe
| 1 ||  || MBA-I || 18.6 || data-sort-value="0.57" | 570 m || multiple || 2002–2019 || 28 Oct 2019 || 75 || align=left | Disc.: NEAT || 
|- id="2002 QT117" bgcolor=#fefefe
| 2 ||  || MBA-I || 19.0 || data-sort-value="0.47" | 470 m || multiple || 1995–2020 || 15 Oct 2020 || 45 || align=left | Disc.: NEAT || 
|- id="2002 QU117" bgcolor=#E9E9E9
| 0 ||  || MBA-M || 17.55 || 1.7 km || multiple || 2002–2021 || 30 Nov 2021 || 88 || align=left | Disc.: NEATAlt.: 2007 SD24 || 
|- id="2002 QX117" bgcolor=#E9E9E9
| 0 ||  || MBA-M || 17.52 || data-sort-value="0.93" | 930 m || multiple || 2002–2021 || 03 May 2021 || 97 || align=left | Disc.: NEAT || 
|- id="2002 QD118" bgcolor=#fefefe
| – ||  || MBA-I || 19.4 || data-sort-value="0.39" | 390 m || single || 2 days || 19 Aug 2002 || 12 || align=left | Disc.: NEAT || 
|- id="2002 QE118" bgcolor=#E9E9E9
| – ||  || MBA-M || 19.0 || data-sort-value="0.47" | 470 m || single || 12 days || 30 Aug 2002 || 9 || align=left | Disc.: NEAT || 
|- id="2002 QH118" bgcolor=#E9E9E9
| 0 ||  || MBA-M || 17.6 || data-sort-value="0.90" | 900 m || multiple || 2002–2019 || 04 Nov 2019 || 69 || align=left | Disc.: NEAT || 
|- id="2002 QM118" bgcolor=#fefefe
| 0 ||  || MBA-I || 18.79 || data-sort-value="0.52" | 520 m || multiple || 2002–2021 || 03 Apr 2021 || 29 || align=left | Disc.: NEAT || 
|- id="2002 QO118" bgcolor=#E9E9E9
| 0 ||  || MBA-M || 17.7 || data-sort-value="0.86" | 860 m || multiple || 2002–2019 || 24 Dec 2019 || 70 || align=left | Disc.: NEAT || 
|- id="2002 QT118" bgcolor=#E9E9E9
| 1 ||  || MBA-M || 18.1 || data-sort-value="0.71" | 710 m || multiple || 2002–2019 || 20 Dec 2019 || 42 || align=left | Disc.: NEAT || 
|- id="2002 QW118" bgcolor=#fefefe
| 0 ||  || MBA-I || 18.1 || data-sort-value="0.71" | 710 m || multiple || 2002–2020 || 14 Dec 2020 || 83 || align=left | Disc.: NEAT || 
|- id="2002 QY118" bgcolor=#fefefe
| 0 ||  || MBA-I || 18.4 || data-sort-value="0.62" | 620 m || multiple || 2002–2020 || 24 Oct 2020 || 96 || align=left | Disc.: NEAT || 
|- id="2002 QP119" bgcolor=#fefefe
| 0 ||  || MBA-I || 18.2 || data-sort-value="0.68" | 680 m || multiple || 2002–2020 || 15 Dec 2020 || 134 || align=left | Disc.: NEAT || 
|- id="2002 QT119" bgcolor=#fefefe
| 0 ||  || MBA-I || 19.08 || data-sort-value="0.45" | 450 m || multiple || 2002–2021 || 06 Oct 2021 || 64 || align=left | Disc.: NEAT || 
|}
back to top

References 
 

Lists of unnumbered minor planets